

460001–460100 

|-bgcolor=#E9E9E9
| 460001 ||  || — || September 10, 2010 || Mount Lemmon || Mount Lemmon Survey || — || align=right | 2.4 km || 
|-id=002 bgcolor=#fefefe
| 460002 ||  || — || October 1, 2011 || Kitt Peak || Spacewatch || V || align=right data-sort-value="0.55" | 550 m || 
|-id=003 bgcolor=#E9E9E9
| 460003 ||  || — || March 17, 2012 || Mount Lemmon || Mount Lemmon Survey || EUN || align=right | 1.3 km || 
|-id=004 bgcolor=#E9E9E9
| 460004 ||  || — || June 29, 2005 || Kitt Peak || Spacewatch || EUN || align=right | 1.1 km || 
|-id=005 bgcolor=#d6d6d6
| 460005 ||  || — || February 3, 2010 || WISE || WISE || — || align=right | 2.2 km || 
|-id=006 bgcolor=#E9E9E9
| 460006 ||  || — || November 17, 2006 || Mount Lemmon || Mount Lemmon Survey || — || align=right | 2.3 km || 
|-id=007 bgcolor=#fefefe
| 460007 ||  || — || October 22, 2005 || Kitt Peak || Spacewatch || — || align=right data-sort-value="0.51" | 510 m || 
|-id=008 bgcolor=#fefefe
| 460008 ||  || — || December 20, 2007 || Mount Lemmon || Mount Lemmon Survey || H || align=right data-sort-value="0.83" | 830 m || 
|-id=009 bgcolor=#d6d6d6
| 460009 ||  || — || July 26, 2008 || Siding Spring || SSS || — || align=right | 3.4 km || 
|-id=010 bgcolor=#fefefe
| 460010 ||  || — || November 5, 2007 || Kitt Peak || Spacewatch || — || align=right data-sort-value="0.94" | 940 m || 
|-id=011 bgcolor=#fefefe
| 460011 ||  || — || September 10, 2004 || Kitt Peak || Spacewatch || — || align=right data-sort-value="0.79" | 790 m || 
|-id=012 bgcolor=#fefefe
| 460012 ||  || — || October 7, 2005 || Kitt Peak || Spacewatch || — || align=right data-sort-value="0.53" | 530 m || 
|-id=013 bgcolor=#E9E9E9
| 460013 ||  || — || September 13, 2005 || Kitt Peak || Spacewatch || AGN || align=right data-sort-value="0.95" | 950 m || 
|-id=014 bgcolor=#d6d6d6
| 460014 ||  || — || December 26, 2005 || Mount Lemmon || Mount Lemmon Survey || — || align=right | 2.6 km || 
|-id=015 bgcolor=#fefefe
| 460015 ||  || — || May 8, 2006 || Mount Lemmon || Mount Lemmon Survey || — || align=right data-sort-value="0.76" | 760 m || 
|-id=016 bgcolor=#E9E9E9
| 460016 ||  || — || February 28, 2008 || Kitt Peak || Spacewatch || — || align=right | 1.7 km || 
|-id=017 bgcolor=#E9E9E9
| 460017 ||  || — || November 21, 2006 || Mount Lemmon || Mount Lemmon Survey || — || align=right | 1.9 km || 
|-id=018 bgcolor=#E9E9E9
| 460018 ||  || — || September 4, 2010 || Mount Lemmon || Mount Lemmon Survey || — || align=right | 1.0 km || 
|-id=019 bgcolor=#fefefe
| 460019 ||  || — || November 8, 2007 || Kitt Peak || Spacewatch || NYS || align=right data-sort-value="0.65" | 650 m || 
|-id=020 bgcolor=#fefefe
| 460020 ||  || — || September 14, 2007 || Mount Lemmon || Mount Lemmon Survey || NYS || align=right data-sort-value="0.63" | 630 m || 
|-id=021 bgcolor=#E9E9E9
| 460021 ||  || — || September 18, 2006 || Kitt Peak || Spacewatch || — || align=right | 1.0 km || 
|-id=022 bgcolor=#E9E9E9
| 460022 ||  || — || October 3, 2010 || Kitt Peak || Spacewatch || — || align=right | 1.3 km || 
|-id=023 bgcolor=#E9E9E9
| 460023 ||  || — || March 14, 2013 || Kitt Peak || Spacewatch || — || align=right | 1.4 km || 
|-id=024 bgcolor=#fefefe
| 460024 ||  || — || October 19, 2003 || Kitt Peak || Spacewatch || MAS || align=right data-sort-value="0.59" | 590 m || 
|-id=025 bgcolor=#E9E9E9
| 460025 ||  || — || December 27, 2011 || Kitt Peak || Spacewatch || — || align=right | 2.3 km || 
|-id=026 bgcolor=#E9E9E9
| 460026 ||  || — || October 22, 2006 || Kitt Peak || Spacewatch || — || align=right | 1.2 km || 
|-id=027 bgcolor=#d6d6d6
| 460027 ||  || — || September 27, 2009 || Mount Lemmon || Mount Lemmon Survey || — || align=right | 2.4 km || 
|-id=028 bgcolor=#fefefe
| 460028 ||  || — || May 8, 2010 || Mount Lemmon || Mount Lemmon Survey || — || align=right data-sort-value="0.58" | 580 m || 
|-id=029 bgcolor=#fefefe
| 460029 ||  || — || October 20, 2008 || Kitt Peak || Spacewatch || — || align=right data-sort-value="0.78" | 780 m || 
|-id=030 bgcolor=#fefefe
| 460030 ||  || — || October 21, 2011 || Kitt Peak || Spacewatch || V || align=right data-sort-value="0.47" | 470 m || 
|-id=031 bgcolor=#E9E9E9
| 460031 ||  || — || September 30, 2010 || Mount Lemmon || Mount Lemmon Survey || MRX || align=right data-sort-value="0.93" | 930 m || 
|-id=032 bgcolor=#E9E9E9
| 460032 ||  || — || November 23, 2006 || Mount Lemmon || Mount Lemmon Survey || — || align=right | 1.5 km || 
|-id=033 bgcolor=#E9E9E9
| 460033 ||  || — || October 20, 2006 || Mount Lemmon || Mount Lemmon Survey || — || align=right | 1.9 km || 
|-id=034 bgcolor=#fefefe
| 460034 ||  || — || December 14, 2004 || Kitt Peak || Spacewatch || — || align=right data-sort-value="0.59" | 590 m || 
|-id=035 bgcolor=#E9E9E9
| 460035 ||  || — || November 2, 2006 || Catalina || CSS || — || align=right | 1.2 km || 
|-id=036 bgcolor=#E9E9E9
| 460036 ||  || — || December 4, 2010 || Mount Lemmon || Mount Lemmon Survey || — || align=right | 1.9 km || 
|-id=037 bgcolor=#E9E9E9
| 460037 ||  || — || September 25, 2005 || Kitt Peak || Spacewatch || — || align=right | 1.5 km || 
|-id=038 bgcolor=#E9E9E9
| 460038 ||  || — || November 7, 2010 || Mount Lemmon || Mount Lemmon Survey || — || align=right | 1.9 km || 
|-id=039 bgcolor=#d6d6d6
| 460039 ||  || — || August 28, 2009 || Kitt Peak || Spacewatch || — || align=right | 2.4 km || 
|-id=040 bgcolor=#E9E9E9
| 460040 ||  || — || October 11, 2010 || Mount Lemmon || Mount Lemmon Survey || — || align=right | 1.4 km || 
|-id=041 bgcolor=#d6d6d6
| 460041 ||  || — || November 22, 2005 || Kitt Peak || Spacewatch || — || align=right | 2.2 km || 
|-id=042 bgcolor=#d6d6d6
| 460042 ||  || — || September 23, 2009 || Mount Lemmon || Mount Lemmon Survey || — || align=right | 2.2 km || 
|-id=043 bgcolor=#E9E9E9
| 460043 ||  || — || August 28, 2005 || Kitt Peak || Spacewatch || — || align=right | 1.9 km || 
|-id=044 bgcolor=#E9E9E9
| 460044 ||  || — || July 30, 2010 || WISE || WISE || — || align=right | 2.4 km || 
|-id=045 bgcolor=#d6d6d6
| 460045 ||  || — || July 1, 2014 || Mount Lemmon || Mount Lemmon Survey || — || align=right | 3.6 km || 
|-id=046 bgcolor=#fefefe
| 460046 ||  || — || January 30, 2009 || Mount Lemmon || Mount Lemmon Survey || V || align=right data-sort-value="0.48" | 480 m || 
|-id=047 bgcolor=#fefefe
| 460047 ||  || — || September 10, 2007 || Kitt Peak || Spacewatch || — || align=right data-sort-value="0.73" | 730 m || 
|-id=048 bgcolor=#fefefe
| 460048 ||  || — || September 4, 1999 || Kitt Peak || Spacewatch || — || align=right data-sort-value="0.62" | 620 m || 
|-id=049 bgcolor=#d6d6d6
| 460049 ||  || — || December 19, 2009 || Catalina || CSS || Tj (2.99) || align=right | 3.8 km || 
|-id=050 bgcolor=#E9E9E9
| 460050 ||  || — || July 30, 2010 || WISE || WISE || — || align=right | 1.6 km || 
|-id=051 bgcolor=#d6d6d6
| 460051 ||  || — || January 28, 2010 || WISE || WISE || — || align=right | 3.4 km || 
|-id=052 bgcolor=#E9E9E9
| 460052 ||  || — || May 20, 2013 || Siding Spring || SSS || EUN || align=right | 1.7 km || 
|-id=053 bgcolor=#fefefe
| 460053 ||  || — || January 25, 2006 || Kitt Peak || Spacewatch || — || align=right data-sort-value="0.75" | 750 m || 
|-id=054 bgcolor=#fefefe
| 460054 ||  || — || September 12, 2007 || Catalina || CSS || NYS || align=right data-sort-value="0.60" | 600 m || 
|-id=055 bgcolor=#fefefe
| 460055 ||  || — || October 20, 2007 || Mount Lemmon || Mount Lemmon Survey || V || align=right data-sort-value="0.60" | 600 m || 
|-id=056 bgcolor=#fefefe
| 460056 ||  || — || October 18, 2003 || Kitt Peak || Spacewatch || — || align=right data-sort-value="0.78" | 780 m || 
|-id=057 bgcolor=#fefefe
| 460057 ||  || — || December 18, 2004 || Mount Lemmon || Mount Lemmon Survey || — || align=right data-sort-value="0.74" | 740 m || 
|-id=058 bgcolor=#E9E9E9
| 460058 ||  || — || October 18, 2001 || Socorro || LINEAR || — || align=right | 2.6 km || 
|-id=059 bgcolor=#fefefe
| 460059 ||  || — || September 15, 2004 || Anderson Mesa || LONEOS || — || align=right data-sort-value="0.71" | 710 m || 
|-id=060 bgcolor=#fefefe
| 460060 ||  || — || January 15, 2009 || Kitt Peak || Spacewatch || — || align=right data-sort-value="0.88" | 880 m || 
|-id=061 bgcolor=#fefefe
| 460061 ||  || — || October 29, 2011 || Kitt Peak || Spacewatch || — || align=right data-sort-value="0.80" | 800 m || 
|-id=062 bgcolor=#E9E9E9
| 460062 ||  || — || December 4, 2007 || Mount Lemmon || Mount Lemmon Survey || — || align=right | 1.1 km || 
|-id=063 bgcolor=#E9E9E9
| 460063 ||  || — || October 31, 2010 || Mount Lemmon || Mount Lemmon Survey || — || align=right | 2.1 km || 
|-id=064 bgcolor=#fefefe
| 460064 ||  || — || October 8, 2004 || Kitt Peak || Spacewatch || — || align=right data-sort-value="0.76" | 760 m || 
|-id=065 bgcolor=#d6d6d6
| 460065 ||  || — || October 26, 2009 || Kitt Peak || Spacewatch || — || align=right | 2.4 km || 
|-id=066 bgcolor=#d6d6d6
| 460066 ||  || — || December 14, 2003 || Kitt Peak || Spacewatch || THM || align=right | 2.4 km || 
|-id=067 bgcolor=#d6d6d6
| 460067 ||  || — || September 17, 2009 || Kitt Peak || Spacewatch || — || align=right | 3.2 km || 
|-id=068 bgcolor=#fefefe
| 460068 ||  || — || January 20, 2009 || Kitt Peak || Spacewatch || — || align=right data-sort-value="0.79" | 790 m || 
|-id=069 bgcolor=#fefefe
| 460069 ||  || — || September 11, 2007 || Mount Lemmon || Mount Lemmon Survey || — || align=right data-sort-value="0.62" | 620 m || 
|-id=070 bgcolor=#fefefe
| 460070 ||  || — || May 11, 2010 || Mount Lemmon || Mount Lemmon Survey || — || align=right data-sort-value="0.78" | 780 m || 
|-id=071 bgcolor=#fefefe
| 460071 ||  || — || November 3, 2008 || Kitt Peak || Spacewatch || — || align=right data-sort-value="0.56" | 560 m || 
|-id=072 bgcolor=#d6d6d6
| 460072 ||  || — || August 16, 2009 || Kitt Peak || Spacewatch || — || align=right | 2.6 km || 
|-id=073 bgcolor=#fefefe
| 460073 ||  || — || December 22, 2008 || Kitt Peak || Spacewatch || — || align=right data-sort-value="0.81" | 810 m || 
|-id=074 bgcolor=#fefefe
| 460074 ||  || — || May 18, 2010 || WISE || WISE || — || align=right | 2.5 km || 
|-id=075 bgcolor=#E9E9E9
| 460075 ||  || — || August 31, 2005 || Kitt Peak || Spacewatch || — || align=right | 1.8 km || 
|-id=076 bgcolor=#d6d6d6
| 460076 ||  || — || November 10, 2009 || Kitt Peak || Spacewatch || THM || align=right | 2.0 km || 
|-id=077 bgcolor=#E9E9E9
| 460077 ||  || — || February 26, 2007 || Mount Lemmon || Mount Lemmon Survey || — || align=right | 2.3 km || 
|-id=078 bgcolor=#E9E9E9
| 460078 ||  || — || January 25, 2007 || Kitt Peak || Spacewatch || — || align=right | 2.4 km || 
|-id=079 bgcolor=#fefefe
| 460079 ||  || — || March 11, 2002 || Kitt Peak || Spacewatch || — || align=right data-sort-value="0.85" | 850 m || 
|-id=080 bgcolor=#fefefe
| 460080 ||  || — || April 11, 2010 || Kitt Peak || Spacewatch || — || align=right data-sort-value="0.91" | 910 m || 
|-id=081 bgcolor=#fefefe
| 460081 ||  || — || November 10, 2004 || Kitt Peak || Spacewatch || — || align=right data-sort-value="0.55" | 550 m || 
|-id=082 bgcolor=#E9E9E9
| 460082 ||  || — || September 7, 2000 || Kitt Peak || Spacewatch || — || align=right | 2.5 km || 
|-id=083 bgcolor=#E9E9E9
| 460083 ||  || — || January 18, 2008 || Mount Lemmon || Mount Lemmon Survey || — || align=right | 1.1 km || 
|-id=084 bgcolor=#d6d6d6
| 460084 ||  || — || December 24, 2005 || Kitt Peak || Spacewatch || — || align=right | 2.1 km || 
|-id=085 bgcolor=#E9E9E9
| 460085 ||  || — || January 26, 2012 || Mount Lemmon || Mount Lemmon Survey || — || align=right | 1.5 km || 
|-id=086 bgcolor=#fefefe
| 460086 ||  || — || January 2, 2012 || Kitt Peak || Spacewatch || — || align=right data-sort-value="0.93" | 930 m || 
|-id=087 bgcolor=#d6d6d6
| 460087 ||  || — || February 2, 2005 || Kitt Peak || Spacewatch || — || align=right | 4.0 km || 
|-id=088 bgcolor=#fefefe
| 460088 ||  || — || September 18, 2003 || Kitt Peak || Spacewatch || MAS || align=right data-sort-value="0.61" | 610 m || 
|-id=089 bgcolor=#E9E9E9
| 460089 ||  || — || March 13, 2013 || Kitt Peak || Spacewatch || — || align=right | 2.2 km || 
|-id=090 bgcolor=#E9E9E9
| 460090 ||  || — || November 6, 2010 || Mount Lemmon || Mount Lemmon Survey || — || align=right | 1.9 km || 
|-id=091 bgcolor=#d6d6d6
| 460091 ||  || — || October 7, 2004 || Kitt Peak || Spacewatch || — || align=right | 1.7 km || 
|-id=092 bgcolor=#fefefe
| 460092 ||  || — || September 25, 2006 || Catalina || CSS || H || align=right data-sort-value="0.73" | 730 m || 
|-id=093 bgcolor=#E9E9E9
| 460093 ||  || — || January 27, 2012 || Kitt Peak || Spacewatch || — || align=right | 2.0 km || 
|-id=094 bgcolor=#d6d6d6
| 460094 ||  || — || September 17, 2009 || Kitt Peak || Spacewatch || THM || align=right | 1.8 km || 
|-id=095 bgcolor=#E9E9E9
| 460095 ||  || — || October 28, 2005 || Catalina || CSS || — || align=right | 2.0 km || 
|-id=096 bgcolor=#fefefe
| 460096 ||  || — || April 9, 1996 || Kitt Peak || Spacewatch || — || align=right | 1.2 km || 
|-id=097 bgcolor=#d6d6d6
| 460097 ||  || — || January 30, 2006 || Kitt Peak || Spacewatch || — || align=right | 2.8 km || 
|-id=098 bgcolor=#fefefe
| 460098 ||  || — || October 8, 2007 || Catalina || CSS || — || align=right data-sort-value="0.87" | 870 m || 
|-id=099 bgcolor=#d6d6d6
| 460099 ||  || — || September 12, 2009 || Kitt Peak || Spacewatch || THM || align=right | 1.9 km || 
|-id=100 bgcolor=#fefefe
| 460100 ||  || — || August 10, 2004 || Campo Imperatore || CINEOS || — || align=right data-sort-value="0.69" | 690 m || 
|}

460101–460200 

|-bgcolor=#d6d6d6
| 460101 ||  || — || September 3, 2010 || Mount Lemmon || Mount Lemmon Survey || — || align=right | 2.5 km || 
|-id=102 bgcolor=#d6d6d6
| 460102 ||  || — || January 13, 2010 || WISE || WISE || LIX || align=right | 2.6 km || 
|-id=103 bgcolor=#E9E9E9
| 460103 ||  || — || September 5, 2010 || Mount Lemmon || Mount Lemmon Survey || — || align=right data-sort-value="0.86" | 860 m || 
|-id=104 bgcolor=#E9E9E9
| 460104 ||  || — || February 7, 2008 || Kitt Peak || Spacewatch || EUN || align=right data-sort-value="0.84" | 840 m || 
|-id=105 bgcolor=#d6d6d6
| 460105 ||  || — || December 27, 1999 || Kitt Peak || Spacewatch || — || align=right | 2.6 km || 
|-id=106 bgcolor=#E9E9E9
| 460106 ||  || — || September 23, 2006 || Kitt Peak || Spacewatch || — || align=right data-sort-value="0.78" | 780 m || 
|-id=107 bgcolor=#d6d6d6
| 460107 ||  || — || January 27, 2011 || Mount Lemmon || Mount Lemmon Survey || — || align=right | 2.3 km || 
|-id=108 bgcolor=#E9E9E9
| 460108 ||  || — || October 17, 2010 || Mount Lemmon || Mount Lemmon Survey || — || align=right | 1.0 km || 
|-id=109 bgcolor=#fefefe
| 460109 ||  || — || December 16, 1999 || Kitt Peak || Spacewatch || — || align=right data-sort-value="0.56" | 560 m || 
|-id=110 bgcolor=#fefefe
| 460110 ||  || — || November 7, 2007 || Kitt Peak || Spacewatch || — || align=right data-sort-value="0.81" | 810 m || 
|-id=111 bgcolor=#fefefe
| 460111 ||  || — || September 14, 2007 || Mount Lemmon || Mount Lemmon Survey || NYS || align=right data-sort-value="0.59" | 590 m || 
|-id=112 bgcolor=#E9E9E9
| 460112 ||  || — || January 26, 2007 || Kitt Peak || Spacewatch || — || align=right | 2.8 km || 
|-id=113 bgcolor=#E9E9E9
| 460113 ||  || — || October 4, 2010 || Socorro || LINEAR || critical || align=right | 1.3 km || 
|-id=114 bgcolor=#fefefe
| 460114 ||  || — || February 14, 2009 || Mount Lemmon || Mount Lemmon Survey || V || align=right data-sort-value="0.62" | 620 m || 
|-id=115 bgcolor=#fefefe
| 460115 ||  || — || September 12, 2007 || Mount Lemmon || Mount Lemmon Survey || — || align=right data-sort-value="0.75" | 750 m || 
|-id=116 bgcolor=#E9E9E9
| 460116 ||  || — || August 14, 2010 || Kitt Peak || Spacewatch || RAF || align=right data-sort-value="0.75" | 750 m || 
|-id=117 bgcolor=#d6d6d6
| 460117 ||  || — || September 16, 2009 || Catalina || CSS || — || align=right | 4.2 km || 
|-id=118 bgcolor=#E9E9E9
| 460118 ||  || — || October 11, 2010 || Mount Lemmon || Mount Lemmon Survey || HOF || align=right | 2.3 km || 
|-id=119 bgcolor=#fefefe
| 460119 ||  || — || October 17, 2003 || Kitt Peak || Spacewatch || MAS || align=right data-sort-value="0.78" | 780 m || 
|-id=120 bgcolor=#E9E9E9
| 460120 ||  || — || November 12, 2010 || Mount Lemmon || Mount Lemmon Survey || HOF || align=right | 2.3 km || 
|-id=121 bgcolor=#E9E9E9
| 460121 ||  || — || October 2, 2010 || Kitt Peak || Spacewatch || — || align=right | 1.3 km || 
|-id=122 bgcolor=#fefefe
| 460122 ||  || — || October 6, 1999 || Kitt Peak || Spacewatch || NYS || align=right data-sort-value="0.66" | 660 m || 
|-id=123 bgcolor=#E9E9E9
| 460123 ||  || — || October 14, 1998 || Kitt Peak || Spacewatch || — || align=right data-sort-value="0.70" | 700 m || 
|-id=124 bgcolor=#fefefe
| 460124 ||  || — || February 2, 2012 || Mount Lemmon || Mount Lemmon Survey || — || align=right | 1.0 km || 
|-id=125 bgcolor=#fefefe
| 460125 ||  || — || October 17, 2011 || Kitt Peak || Spacewatch || — || align=right data-sort-value="0.54" | 540 m || 
|-id=126 bgcolor=#E9E9E9
| 460126 ||  || — || October 28, 2005 || Kitt Peak || Spacewatch || — || align=right | 2.1 km || 
|-id=127 bgcolor=#d6d6d6
| 460127 ||  || — || March 31, 2010 || WISE || WISE || 7:4 || align=right | 3.0 km || 
|-id=128 bgcolor=#d6d6d6
| 460128 ||  || — || August 18, 2009 || Kitt Peak || Spacewatch || EOS || align=right | 1.8 km || 
|-id=129 bgcolor=#d6d6d6
| 460129 ||  || — || January 25, 2011 || Kitt Peak || Spacewatch || — || align=right | 2.7 km || 
|-id=130 bgcolor=#E9E9E9
| 460130 ||  || — || February 10, 2008 || Kitt Peak || Spacewatch || EUN || align=right | 1.1 km || 
|-id=131 bgcolor=#E9E9E9
| 460131 ||  || — || April 30, 2009 || Kitt Peak || Spacewatch || — || align=right | 1.8 km || 
|-id=132 bgcolor=#fefefe
| 460132 ||  || — || October 7, 2004 || Kitt Peak || Spacewatch || — || align=right data-sort-value="0.76" | 760 m || 
|-id=133 bgcolor=#fefefe
| 460133 ||  || — || January 31, 2006 || Kitt Peak || Spacewatch || — || align=right data-sort-value="0.57" | 570 m || 
|-id=134 bgcolor=#fefefe
| 460134 ||  || — || January 19, 2012 || Mount Lemmon || Mount Lemmon Survey || — || align=right data-sort-value="0.85" | 850 m || 
|-id=135 bgcolor=#E9E9E9
| 460135 ||  || — || March 6, 2008 || Catalina || CSS || — || align=right | 1.3 km || 
|-id=136 bgcolor=#E9E9E9
| 460136 ||  || — || January 10, 2007 || Kitt Peak || Spacewatch || — || align=right | 1.3 km || 
|-id=137 bgcolor=#E9E9E9
| 460137 ||  || — || September 15, 2010 || Kitt Peak || Spacewatch || — || align=right | 2.5 km || 
|-id=138 bgcolor=#d6d6d6
| 460138 ||  || — || March 19, 2010 || WISE || WISE || Tj (2.99) || align=right | 3.1 km || 
|-id=139 bgcolor=#fefefe
| 460139 ||  || — || May 7, 2010 || Mount Lemmon || Mount Lemmon Survey || — || align=right data-sort-value="0.61" | 610 m || 
|-id=140 bgcolor=#fefefe
| 460140 ||  || — || November 14, 2007 || Mount Lemmon || Mount Lemmon Survey || V || align=right data-sort-value="0.67" | 670 m || 
|-id=141 bgcolor=#d6d6d6
| 460141 ||  || — || August 11, 1997 || Kitt Peak || Spacewatch || THB || align=right | 2.4 km || 
|-id=142 bgcolor=#fefefe
| 460142 ||  || — || November 9, 2007 || Kitt Peak || Spacewatch || — || align=right data-sort-value="0.73" | 730 m || 
|-id=143 bgcolor=#fefefe
| 460143 ||  || — || February 4, 2009 || Mount Lemmon || Mount Lemmon Survey || V || align=right data-sort-value="0.60" | 600 m || 
|-id=144 bgcolor=#E9E9E9
| 460144 ||  || — || July 9, 2010 || WISE || WISE || — || align=right | 3.7 km || 
|-id=145 bgcolor=#d6d6d6
| 460145 ||  || — || November 17, 2009 || Catalina || CSS || — || align=right | 2.2 km || 
|-id=146 bgcolor=#fefefe
| 460146 ||  || — || September 8, 2004 || Socorro || LINEAR || — || align=right data-sort-value="0.65" | 650 m || 
|-id=147 bgcolor=#E9E9E9
| 460147 ||  || — || March 7, 2013 || Kitt Peak || Spacewatch || — || align=right | 3.1 km || 
|-id=148 bgcolor=#fefefe
| 460148 ||  || — || May 7, 2010 || Mount Lemmon || Mount Lemmon Survey || NYS || align=right data-sort-value="0.68" | 680 m || 
|-id=149 bgcolor=#d6d6d6
| 460149 ||  || — || June 7, 2008 || Kitt Peak || Spacewatch || — || align=right | 3.1 km || 
|-id=150 bgcolor=#fefefe
| 460150 ||  || — || June 28, 2011 || Mount Lemmon || Mount Lemmon Survey || — || align=right data-sort-value="0.62" | 620 m || 
|-id=151 bgcolor=#E9E9E9
| 460151 ||  || — || September 18, 2010 || Mount Lemmon || Mount Lemmon Survey || — || align=right | 1.7 km || 
|-id=152 bgcolor=#E9E9E9
| 460152 ||  || — || October 29, 2010 || Mount Lemmon || Mount Lemmon Survey || — || align=right | 1.9 km || 
|-id=153 bgcolor=#fefefe
| 460153 ||  || — || August 8, 2007 || Socorro || LINEAR || — || align=right data-sort-value="0.91" | 910 m || 
|-id=154 bgcolor=#fefefe
| 460154 ||  || — || April 1, 2010 || WISE || WISE || — || align=right | 1.2 km || 
|-id=155 bgcolor=#E9E9E9
| 460155 ||  || — || December 31, 2007 || Kitt Peak || Spacewatch || — || align=right | 1.8 km || 
|-id=156 bgcolor=#E9E9E9
| 460156 ||  || — || October 14, 2010 || Mount Lemmon || Mount Lemmon Survey || — || align=right data-sort-value="0.97" | 970 m || 
|-id=157 bgcolor=#d6d6d6
| 460157 ||  || — || November 21, 2009 || Mount Lemmon || Mount Lemmon Survey || THB || align=right | 3.8 km || 
|-id=158 bgcolor=#E9E9E9
| 460158 ||  || — || February 10, 2008 || Kitt Peak || Spacewatch || — || align=right | 1.0 km || 
|-id=159 bgcolor=#fefefe
| 460159 ||  || — || September 13, 2007 || Catalina || CSS || — || align=right data-sort-value="0.67" | 670 m || 
|-id=160 bgcolor=#d6d6d6
| 460160 ||  || — || January 27, 2010 || WISE || WISE || — || align=right | 3.4 km || 
|-id=161 bgcolor=#E9E9E9
| 460161 ||  || — || January 18, 2012 || Kitt Peak || Spacewatch || — || align=right data-sort-value="0.97" | 970 m || 
|-id=162 bgcolor=#d6d6d6
| 460162 ||  || — || January 31, 2010 || WISE || WISE || — || align=right | 2.9 km || 
|-id=163 bgcolor=#fefefe
| 460163 ||  || — || August 10, 2010 || Kitt Peak || Spacewatch || — || align=right data-sort-value="0.92" | 920 m || 
|-id=164 bgcolor=#d6d6d6
| 460164 ||  || — || December 25, 2005 || Kitt Peak || Spacewatch || EOS || align=right | 2.1 km || 
|-id=165 bgcolor=#d6d6d6
| 460165 ||  || — || October 2, 2009 || Mount Lemmon || Mount Lemmon Survey || — || align=right | 2.6 km || 
|-id=166 bgcolor=#E9E9E9
| 460166 ||  || — || July 18, 2010 || WISE || WISE || — || align=right | 3.7 km || 
|-id=167 bgcolor=#E9E9E9
| 460167 ||  || — || October 31, 2006 || Kitt Peak || Spacewatch || — || align=right data-sort-value="0.94" | 940 m || 
|-id=168 bgcolor=#d6d6d6
| 460168 ||  || — || September 29, 1997 || Kitt Peak || Spacewatch || — || align=right | 2.7 km || 
|-id=169 bgcolor=#fefefe
| 460169 ||  || — || June 30, 2014 || Mount Lemmon || Mount Lemmon Survey || — || align=right data-sort-value="0.80" | 800 m || 
|-id=170 bgcolor=#fefefe
| 460170 ||  || — || September 26, 1995 || Kitt Peak || Spacewatch || — || align=right data-sort-value="0.85" | 850 m || 
|-id=171 bgcolor=#d6d6d6
| 460171 ||  || — || November 5, 1999 || Kitt Peak || Spacewatch || 3:2critical || align=right | 3.7 km || 
|-id=172 bgcolor=#E9E9E9
| 460172 ||  || — || August 19, 2001 || Socorro || LINEAR || — || align=right | 2.0 km || 
|-id=173 bgcolor=#fefefe
| 460173 ||  || — || January 1, 2008 || Mount Lemmon || Mount Lemmon Survey || — || align=right | 1.2 km || 
|-id=174 bgcolor=#d6d6d6
| 460174 ||  || — || December 5, 2005 || Kitt Peak || Spacewatch || — || align=right | 2.5 km || 
|-id=175 bgcolor=#d6d6d6
| 460175 ||  || — || June 14, 2007 || Kitt Peak || Spacewatch || — || align=right | 3.1 km || 
|-id=176 bgcolor=#E9E9E9
| 460176 ||  || — || August 29, 2006 || Kitt Peak || Spacewatch || — || align=right data-sort-value="0.82" | 820 m || 
|-id=177 bgcolor=#d6d6d6
| 460177 ||  || — || October 29, 1994 || Kitt Peak || Spacewatch || EOS || align=right | 1.5 km || 
|-id=178 bgcolor=#fefefe
| 460178 ||  || — || March 11, 2002 || Kitt Peak || Spacewatch || — || align=right data-sort-value="0.78" | 780 m || 
|-id=179 bgcolor=#E9E9E9
| 460179 ||  || — || May 17, 2010 || WISE || WISE || — || align=right | 2.1 km || 
|-id=180 bgcolor=#fefefe
| 460180 ||  || — || September 8, 2007 || Mount Lemmon || Mount Lemmon Survey || V || align=right data-sort-value="0.56" | 560 m || 
|-id=181 bgcolor=#E9E9E9
| 460181 ||  || — || January 1, 2012 || Mount Lemmon || Mount Lemmon Survey || — || align=right data-sort-value="0.81" | 810 m || 
|-id=182 bgcolor=#E9E9E9
| 460182 ||  || — || December 26, 2011 || Kitt Peak || Spacewatch || — || align=right | 1.6 km || 
|-id=183 bgcolor=#fefefe
| 460183 ||  || — || September 10, 2007 || Catalina || CSS || — || align=right data-sort-value="0.63" | 630 m || 
|-id=184 bgcolor=#d6d6d6
| 460184 ||  || — || January 17, 2005 || Socorro || LINEAR || — || align=right | 2.6 km || 
|-id=185 bgcolor=#fefefe
| 460185 ||  || — || March 29, 2009 || Mount Lemmon || Mount Lemmon Survey || — || align=right data-sort-value="0.67" | 670 m || 
|-id=186 bgcolor=#fefefe
| 460186 ||  || — || October 16, 1995 || Kitt Peak || Spacewatch || NYS || align=right data-sort-value="0.66" | 660 m || 
|-id=187 bgcolor=#E9E9E9
| 460187 ||  || — || October 1, 2005 || Kitt Peak || Spacewatch || — || align=right | 1.9 km || 
|-id=188 bgcolor=#E9E9E9
| 460188 ||  || — || September 17, 2006 || Kitt Peak || Spacewatch || — || align=right data-sort-value="0.76" | 760 m || 
|-id=189 bgcolor=#fefefe
| 460189 ||  || — || March 4, 2006 || Mount Lemmon || Mount Lemmon Survey || — || align=right data-sort-value="0.69" | 690 m || 
|-id=190 bgcolor=#d6d6d6
| 460190 ||  || — || March 29, 2012 || Mount Lemmon || Mount Lemmon Survey || — || align=right | 2.6 km || 
|-id=191 bgcolor=#E9E9E9
| 460191 ||  || — || September 28, 2006 || Mount Lemmon || Mount Lemmon Survey || — || align=right | 1.1 km || 
|-id=192 bgcolor=#d6d6d6
| 460192 ||  || — || March 4, 2006 || Kitt Peak || Spacewatch || — || align=right | 2.9 km || 
|-id=193 bgcolor=#E9E9E9
| 460193 ||  || — || September 1, 2005 || Kitt Peak || Spacewatch || — || align=right | 1.6 km || 
|-id=194 bgcolor=#d6d6d6
| 460194 ||  || — || March 13, 2012 || Mount Lemmon || Mount Lemmon Survey || KOR || align=right | 1.6 km || 
|-id=195 bgcolor=#E9E9E9
| 460195 ||  || — || November 15, 2006 || Catalina || CSS || — || align=right | 1.3 km || 
|-id=196 bgcolor=#E9E9E9
| 460196 ||  || — || April 29, 2009 || Kitt Peak || Spacewatch || — || align=right data-sort-value="0.84" | 840 m || 
|-id=197 bgcolor=#fefefe
| 460197 ||  || — || April 4, 2010 || Kitt Peak || Spacewatch || — || align=right data-sort-value="0.57" | 570 m || 
|-id=198 bgcolor=#E9E9E9
| 460198 ||  || — || February 8, 2008 || Kitt Peak || Spacewatch || — || align=right data-sort-value="0.82" | 820 m || 
|-id=199 bgcolor=#d6d6d6
| 460199 ||  || — || February 4, 2011 || Catalina || CSS || — || align=right | 2.6 km || 
|-id=200 bgcolor=#E9E9E9
| 460200 ||  || — || September 28, 2006 || Kitt Peak || Spacewatch || — || align=right data-sort-value="0.98" | 980 m || 
|}

460201–460300 

|-bgcolor=#fefefe
| 460201 ||  || — || October 22, 2011 || Mount Lemmon || Mount Lemmon Survey || — || align=right data-sort-value="0.55" | 550 m || 
|-id=202 bgcolor=#d6d6d6
| 460202 ||  || — || April 2, 2010 || WISE || WISE || Tj (2.98) || align=right | 2.0 km || 
|-id=203 bgcolor=#d6d6d6
| 460203 ||  || — || October 27, 2005 || Kitt Peak || Spacewatch || KOR || align=right | 1.4 km || 
|-id=204 bgcolor=#E9E9E9
| 460204 ||  || — || October 2, 2006 || Mount Lemmon || Mount Lemmon Survey || — || align=right data-sort-value="0.78" | 780 m || 
|-id=205 bgcolor=#fefefe
| 460205 ||  || — || October 8, 2007 || Mount Lemmon || Mount Lemmon Survey || — || align=right data-sort-value="0.74" | 740 m || 
|-id=206 bgcolor=#fefefe
| 460206 ||  || — || September 5, 2007 || Catalina || CSS || — || align=right | 1.1 km || 
|-id=207 bgcolor=#fefefe
| 460207 ||  || — || July 28, 2006 || Siding Spring || SSS || H || align=right data-sort-value="0.72" | 720 m || 
|-id=208 bgcolor=#E9E9E9
| 460208 ||  || — || December 13, 2006 || Kitt Peak || Spacewatch || — || align=right | 2.1 km || 
|-id=209 bgcolor=#d6d6d6
| 460209 ||  || — || January 12, 2010 || WISE || WISE || — || align=right | 2.2 km || 
|-id=210 bgcolor=#E9E9E9
| 460210 ||  || — || April 14, 2008 || Kitt Peak || Spacewatch || NEM || align=right | 2.5 km || 
|-id=211 bgcolor=#fefefe
| 460211 ||  || — || September 15, 2007 || Kitt Peak || Spacewatch || — || align=right data-sort-value="0.68" | 680 m || 
|-id=212 bgcolor=#E9E9E9
| 460212 ||  || — || March 26, 2008 || Mount Lemmon || Mount Lemmon Survey || — || align=right | 1.5 km || 
|-id=213 bgcolor=#d6d6d6
| 460213 ||  || — || February 24, 2010 || WISE || WISE || THB || align=right | 2.1 km || 
|-id=214 bgcolor=#fefefe
| 460214 ||  || — || October 15, 2007 || Mount Lemmon || Mount Lemmon Survey || — || align=right data-sort-value="0.85" | 850 m || 
|-id=215 bgcolor=#E9E9E9
| 460215 ||  || — || September 5, 2010 || Mount Lemmon || Mount Lemmon Survey || — || align=right data-sort-value="0.77" | 770 m || 
|-id=216 bgcolor=#E9E9E9
| 460216 ||  || — || September 18, 2010 || Mount Lemmon || Mount Lemmon Survey || — || align=right data-sort-value="0.96" | 960 m || 
|-id=217 bgcolor=#E9E9E9
| 460217 ||  || — || September 12, 2001 || Kitt Peak || Spacewatch || — || align=right | 1.6 km || 
|-id=218 bgcolor=#d6d6d6
| 460218 ||  || — || January 26, 2010 || WISE || WISE || — || align=right | 2.4 km || 
|-id=219 bgcolor=#d6d6d6
| 460219 ||  || — || September 28, 2003 || Kitt Peak || Spacewatch || HYG || align=right | 2.1 km || 
|-id=220 bgcolor=#E9E9E9
| 460220 ||  || — || August 10, 2010 || Kitt Peak || Spacewatch || (5) || align=right data-sort-value="0.88" | 880 m || 
|-id=221 bgcolor=#E9E9E9
| 460221 ||  || — || February 8, 2008 || Mount Lemmon || Mount Lemmon Survey || — || align=right data-sort-value="0.66" | 660 m || 
|-id=222 bgcolor=#d6d6d6
| 460222 ||  || — || September 27, 2003 || Kitt Peak || Spacewatch || — || align=right | 2.2 km || 
|-id=223 bgcolor=#E9E9E9
| 460223 ||  || — || April 5, 2008 || Mount Lemmon || Mount Lemmon Survey || HOF || align=right | 2.1 km || 
|-id=224 bgcolor=#E9E9E9
| 460224 ||  || — || March 28, 2008 || Mount Lemmon || Mount Lemmon Survey || — || align=right | 2.0 km || 
|-id=225 bgcolor=#fefefe
| 460225 ||  || — || January 15, 2009 || Kitt Peak || Spacewatch || — || align=right data-sort-value="0.88" | 880 m || 
|-id=226 bgcolor=#E9E9E9
| 460226 ||  || — || August 31, 2005 || Kitt Peak || Spacewatch || — || align=right | 1.9 km || 
|-id=227 bgcolor=#d6d6d6
| 460227 ||  || — || September 16, 2009 || Mount Lemmon || Mount Lemmon Survey || — || align=right | 1.8 km || 
|-id=228 bgcolor=#fefefe
| 460228 ||  || — || June 21, 2014 || Mount Lemmon || Mount Lemmon Survey || V || align=right data-sort-value="0.64" | 640 m || 
|-id=229 bgcolor=#E9E9E9
| 460229 ||  || — || August 21, 2006 || Kitt Peak || Spacewatch || — || align=right | 1.1 km || 
|-id=230 bgcolor=#d6d6d6
| 460230 ||  || — || September 7, 2004 || Kitt Peak || Spacewatch || KOR || align=right | 1.2 km || 
|-id=231 bgcolor=#E9E9E9
| 460231 ||  || — || August 29, 2005 || Kitt Peak || Spacewatch || — || align=right | 1.8 km || 
|-id=232 bgcolor=#E9E9E9
| 460232 ||  || — || July 25, 2010 || WISE || WISE || MIS || align=right | 2.7 km || 
|-id=233 bgcolor=#d6d6d6
| 460233 ||  || — || November 16, 1995 || Kitt Peak || Spacewatch || — || align=right | 2.0 km || 
|-id=234 bgcolor=#d6d6d6
| 460234 ||  || — || October 23, 2009 || Mount Lemmon || Mount Lemmon Survey || THM || align=right | 1.9 km || 
|-id=235 bgcolor=#fefefe
| 460235 ||  || — || August 12, 1997 || Kitt Peak || Spacewatch || — || align=right data-sort-value="0.71" | 710 m || 
|-id=236 bgcolor=#E9E9E9
| 460236 ||  || — || September 30, 2010 || Mount Lemmon || Mount Lemmon Survey || WIT || align=right data-sort-value="0.93" | 930 m || 
|-id=237 bgcolor=#d6d6d6
| 460237 ||  || — || January 26, 2006 || Kitt Peak || Spacewatch || — || align=right | 3.2 km || 
|-id=238 bgcolor=#E9E9E9
| 460238 ||  || — || February 7, 2008 || Mount Lemmon || Mount Lemmon Survey || — || align=right | 1.00 km || 
|-id=239 bgcolor=#E9E9E9
| 460239 ||  || — || May 7, 2008 || Mount Lemmon || Mount Lemmon Survey || — || align=right | 2.5 km || 
|-id=240 bgcolor=#E9E9E9
| 460240 ||  || — || November 6, 2010 || Mount Lemmon || Mount Lemmon Survey || GEF || align=right | 1.1 km || 
|-id=241 bgcolor=#d6d6d6
| 460241 ||  || — || January 13, 2011 || Mount Lemmon || Mount Lemmon Survey || — || align=right | 2.9 km || 
|-id=242 bgcolor=#d6d6d6
| 460242 ||  || — || December 17, 2009 || Mount Lemmon || Mount Lemmon Survey || — || align=right | 2.5 km || 
|-id=243 bgcolor=#d6d6d6
| 460243 ||  || — || February 14, 2010 || WISE || WISE || — || align=right | 4.4 km || 
|-id=244 bgcolor=#fefefe
| 460244 ||  || — || February 4, 2005 || Kitt Peak || Spacewatch || — || align=right data-sort-value="0.92" | 920 m || 
|-id=245 bgcolor=#E9E9E9
| 460245 ||  || — || June 27, 2010 || WISE || WISE || KON || align=right | 2.3 km || 
|-id=246 bgcolor=#fefefe
| 460246 ||  || — || March 4, 2005 || Mount Lemmon || Mount Lemmon Survey || — || align=right data-sort-value="0.71" | 710 m || 
|-id=247 bgcolor=#d6d6d6
| 460247 ||  || — || September 6, 2008 || Catalina || CSS || — || align=right | 2.9 km || 
|-id=248 bgcolor=#d6d6d6
| 460248 ||  || — || May 12, 2007 || Kitt Peak || Spacewatch || — || align=right | 3.1 km || 
|-id=249 bgcolor=#E9E9E9
| 460249 ||  || — || January 10, 2007 || Kitt Peak || Spacewatch || — || align=right | 1.9 km || 
|-id=250 bgcolor=#fefefe
| 460250 ||  || — || December 29, 2011 || Kitt Peak || Spacewatch || — || align=right data-sort-value="0.75" | 750 m || 
|-id=251 bgcolor=#E9E9E9
| 460251 ||  || — || January 18, 2012 || Mount Lemmon || Mount Lemmon Survey || — || align=right | 1.3 km || 
|-id=252 bgcolor=#fefefe
| 460252 ||  || — || November 7, 2007 || Mount Lemmon || Mount Lemmon Survey || — || align=right data-sort-value="0.68" | 680 m || 
|-id=253 bgcolor=#d6d6d6
| 460253 ||  || — || October 22, 2009 || Mount Lemmon || Mount Lemmon Survey || THM || align=right | 2.1 km || 
|-id=254 bgcolor=#fefefe
| 460254 ||  || — || September 21, 2011 || Kitt Peak || Spacewatch || — || align=right data-sort-value="0.54" | 540 m || 
|-id=255 bgcolor=#E9E9E9
| 460255 ||  || — || December 31, 2007 || Kitt Peak || Spacewatch || — || align=right data-sort-value="0.74" | 740 m || 
|-id=256 bgcolor=#d6d6d6
| 460256 ||  || — || September 27, 2009 || Mount Lemmon || Mount Lemmon Survey || — || align=right | 2.8 km || 
|-id=257 bgcolor=#E9E9E9
| 460257 ||  || — || November 1, 2006 || Mount Lemmon || Mount Lemmon Survey || — || align=right | 1.5 km || 
|-id=258 bgcolor=#E9E9E9
| 460258 ||  || — || January 2, 2012 || Catalina || CSS || EUN || align=right | 1.4 km || 
|-id=259 bgcolor=#E9E9E9
| 460259 ||  || — || September 13, 2005 || Catalina || CSS || — || align=right | 2.4 km || 
|-id=260 bgcolor=#fefefe
| 460260 ||  || — || October 12, 2007 || Mount Lemmon || Mount Lemmon Survey || — || align=right data-sort-value="0.79" | 790 m || 
|-id=261 bgcolor=#E9E9E9
| 460261 ||  || — || November 3, 2010 || Kitt Peak || Spacewatch || — || align=right | 2.0 km || 
|-id=262 bgcolor=#d6d6d6
| 460262 ||  || — || December 25, 2010 || Kitt Peak || Spacewatch || — || align=right | 3.0 km || 
|-id=263 bgcolor=#fefefe
| 460263 ||  || — || September 11, 2010 || Mount Lemmon || Mount Lemmon Survey || — || align=right data-sort-value="0.75" | 750 m || 
|-id=264 bgcolor=#E9E9E9
| 460264 ||  || — || November 1, 2010 || Kitt Peak || Spacewatch || — || align=right | 2.2 km || 
|-id=265 bgcolor=#E9E9E9
| 460265 ||  || — || February 2, 2008 || Mount Lemmon || Mount Lemmon Survey || — || align=right | 1.3 km || 
|-id=266 bgcolor=#E9E9E9
| 460266 ||  || — || October 3, 2006 || Mount Lemmon || Mount Lemmon Survey || — || align=right | 1.2 km || 
|-id=267 bgcolor=#d6d6d6
| 460267 ||  || — || May 3, 2008 || Kitt Peak || Spacewatch || EOS || align=right | 1.4 km || 
|-id=268 bgcolor=#E9E9E9
| 460268 ||  || — || October 18, 2006 || Kitt Peak || Spacewatch || — || align=right | 1.3 km || 
|-id=269 bgcolor=#fefefe
| 460269 ||  || — || February 25, 2006 || Kitt Peak || Spacewatch || — || align=right data-sort-value="0.78" | 780 m || 
|-id=270 bgcolor=#E9E9E9
| 460270 ||  || — || October 6, 2005 || Mount Lemmon || Mount Lemmon Survey || — || align=right | 2.0 km || 
|-id=271 bgcolor=#d6d6d6
| 460271 ||  || — || November 30, 2005 || Kitt Peak || Spacewatch || KOR || align=right | 1.1 km || 
|-id=272 bgcolor=#fefefe
| 460272 ||  || — || March 25, 2006 || Kitt Peak || Spacewatch || — || align=right | 1.1 km || 
|-id=273 bgcolor=#E9E9E9
| 460273 ||  || — || March 23, 2012 || Mount Lemmon || Mount Lemmon Survey || — || align=right | 2.2 km || 
|-id=274 bgcolor=#fefefe
| 460274 ||  || — || January 4, 2012 || Mount Lemmon || Mount Lemmon Survey || — || align=right data-sort-value="0.82" | 820 m || 
|-id=275 bgcolor=#d6d6d6
| 460275 ||  || — || January 26, 2011 || Mount Lemmon || Mount Lemmon Survey || — || align=right | 2.4 km || 
|-id=276 bgcolor=#d6d6d6
| 460276 ||  || — || March 26, 2007 || Kitt Peak || Spacewatch || — || align=right | 2.6 km || 
|-id=277 bgcolor=#E9E9E9
| 460277 ||  || — || February 11, 2012 || Mount Lemmon || Mount Lemmon Survey || EUN || align=right | 1.0 km || 
|-id=278 bgcolor=#d6d6d6
| 460278 ||  || — || December 28, 2005 || Kitt Peak || Spacewatch || — || align=right | 2.3 km || 
|-id=279 bgcolor=#fefefe
| 460279 ||  || — || October 8, 2004 || Kitt Peak || Spacewatch || — || align=right data-sort-value="0.80" | 800 m || 
|-id=280 bgcolor=#E9E9E9
| 460280 ||  || — || August 5, 2010 || WISE || WISE || — || align=right | 1.8 km || 
|-id=281 bgcolor=#E9E9E9
| 460281 ||  || — || November 16, 2006 || Mount Lemmon || Mount Lemmon Survey || — || align=right | 1.1 km || 
|-id=282 bgcolor=#d6d6d6
| 460282 ||  || — || September 20, 2006 || Kitt Peak || Spacewatch || 3:2 || align=right | 4.5 km || 
|-id=283 bgcolor=#d6d6d6
| 460283 ||  || — || December 21, 2005 || Kitt Peak || Spacewatch || KOR || align=right | 1.3 km || 
|-id=284 bgcolor=#E9E9E9
| 460284 ||  || — || February 17, 2007 || Mount Lemmon || Mount Lemmon Survey || critical || align=right | 1.6 km || 
|-id=285 bgcolor=#fefefe
| 460285 ||  || — || November 23, 2011 || Mount Lemmon || Mount Lemmon Survey || — || align=right data-sort-value="0.64" | 640 m || 
|-id=286 bgcolor=#d6d6d6
| 460286 ||  || — || September 16, 2003 || Kitt Peak || Spacewatch || — || align=right | 3.4 km || 
|-id=287 bgcolor=#E9E9E9
| 460287 ||  || — || November 6, 2010 || Mount Lemmon || Mount Lemmon Survey || — || align=right | 1.5 km || 
|-id=288 bgcolor=#fefefe
| 460288 ||  || — || December 31, 2008 || Kitt Peak || Spacewatch || — || align=right data-sort-value="0.88" | 880 m || 
|-id=289 bgcolor=#E9E9E9
| 460289 ||  || — || November 3, 2005 || Catalina || CSS || — || align=right | 1.8 km || 
|-id=290 bgcolor=#d6d6d6
| 460290 ||  || — || November 26, 2005 || Mount Lemmon || Mount Lemmon Survey || KOR || align=right | 1.2 km || 
|-id=291 bgcolor=#d6d6d6
| 460291 ||  || — || September 28, 2003 || Kitt Peak || Spacewatch || THM || align=right | 2.1 km || 
|-id=292 bgcolor=#E9E9E9
| 460292 ||  || — || September 13, 2005 || Kitt Peak || Spacewatch || — || align=right | 1.8 km || 
|-id=293 bgcolor=#E9E9E9
| 460293 ||  || — || May 1, 2009 || Mount Lemmon || Mount Lemmon Survey || EUN || align=right | 1.1 km || 
|-id=294 bgcolor=#E9E9E9
| 460294 ||  || — || October 25, 2005 || Kitt Peak || Spacewatch || — || align=right | 2.1 km || 
|-id=295 bgcolor=#d6d6d6
| 460295 ||  || — || December 18, 2004 || Mount Lemmon || Mount Lemmon Survey || — || align=right | 2.6 km || 
|-id=296 bgcolor=#fefefe
| 460296 ||  || — || November 13, 2007 || Mount Lemmon || Mount Lemmon Survey || — || align=right | 1.0 km || 
|-id=297 bgcolor=#E9E9E9
| 460297 ||  || — || November 23, 2006 || Kitt Peak || Spacewatch || — || align=right | 1.4 km || 
|-id=298 bgcolor=#d6d6d6
| 460298 ||  || — || November 22, 2005 || Kitt Peak || Spacewatch || — || align=right | 2.5 km || 
|-id=299 bgcolor=#d6d6d6
| 460299 ||  || — || September 17, 2009 || Mount Lemmon || Mount Lemmon Survey || — || align=right | 2.2 km || 
|-id=300 bgcolor=#fefefe
| 460300 ||  || — || September 10, 2007 || Kitt Peak || Spacewatch || V || align=right data-sort-value="0.66" | 660 m || 
|}

460301–460400 

|-bgcolor=#E9E9E9
| 460301 ||  || — || October 18, 2006 || Kitt Peak || Spacewatch || — || align=right data-sort-value="0.94" | 940 m || 
|-id=302 bgcolor=#fefefe
| 460302 ||  || — || April 30, 2010 || WISE || WISE || — || align=right | 1.6 km || 
|-id=303 bgcolor=#E9E9E9
| 460303 ||  || — || October 17, 2010 || Mount Lemmon || Mount Lemmon Survey || — || align=right | 1.3 km || 
|-id=304 bgcolor=#fefefe
| 460304 ||  || — || October 5, 2003 || Kitt Peak || Spacewatch || V || align=right data-sort-value="0.64" | 640 m || 
|-id=305 bgcolor=#d6d6d6
| 460305 ||  || — || January 22, 2006 || Mount Lemmon || Mount Lemmon Survey || — || align=right | 2.9 km || 
|-id=306 bgcolor=#fefefe
| 460306 ||  || — || February 21, 2009 || Mount Lemmon || Mount Lemmon Survey || — || align=right data-sort-value="0.77" | 770 m || 
|-id=307 bgcolor=#d6d6d6
| 460307 ||  || — || August 4, 2008 || Siding Spring || SSS || — || align=right | 3.1 km || 
|-id=308 bgcolor=#E9E9E9
| 460308 ||  || — || October 26, 2005 || Kitt Peak || Spacewatch || — || align=right | 2.0 km || 
|-id=309 bgcolor=#d6d6d6
| 460309 ||  || — || October 3, 2003 || Kitt Peak || Spacewatch || — || align=right | 2.2 km || 
|-id=310 bgcolor=#fefefe
| 460310 ||  || — || April 3, 2000 || Kitt Peak || Spacewatch || — || align=right data-sort-value="0.68" | 680 m || 
|-id=311 bgcolor=#E9E9E9
| 460311 ||  || — || November 15, 2010 || Mount Lemmon || Mount Lemmon Survey || — || align=right | 1.0 km || 
|-id=312 bgcolor=#E9E9E9
| 460312 ||  || — || November 13, 2010 || Mount Lemmon || Mount Lemmon Survey || — || align=right | 1.4 km || 
|-id=313 bgcolor=#fefefe
| 460313 ||  || — || February 19, 2009 || Kitt Peak || Spacewatch || — || align=right data-sort-value="0.82" | 820 m || 
|-id=314 bgcolor=#d6d6d6
| 460314 ||  || — || July 31, 2008 || Mount Lemmon || Mount Lemmon Survey || — || align=right | 2.4 km || 
|-id=315 bgcolor=#d6d6d6
| 460315 ||  || — || November 25, 2005 || Mount Lemmon || Mount Lemmon Survey || — || align=right | 2.0 km || 
|-id=316 bgcolor=#fefefe
| 460316 ||  || — || January 7, 2005 || Kitt Peak || Spacewatch || — || align=right data-sort-value="0.73" | 730 m || 
|-id=317 bgcolor=#d6d6d6
| 460317 ||  || — || February 17, 2007 || Kitt Peak || Spacewatch || KOR || align=right | 1.3 km || 
|-id=318 bgcolor=#E9E9E9
| 460318 ||  || — || October 2, 2006 || Mount Lemmon || Mount Lemmon Survey || — || align=right | 1.2 km || 
|-id=319 bgcolor=#E9E9E9
| 460319 ||  || — || August 29, 2005 || Kitt Peak || Spacewatch || — || align=right | 1.5 km || 
|-id=320 bgcolor=#fefefe
| 460320 ||  || — || December 30, 2008 || Mount Lemmon || Mount Lemmon Survey || — || align=right data-sort-value="0.59" | 590 m || 
|-id=321 bgcolor=#fefefe
| 460321 ||  || — || December 26, 2011 || Kitt Peak || Spacewatch || NYS || align=right data-sort-value="0.59" | 590 m || 
|-id=322 bgcolor=#d6d6d6
| 460322 ||  || — || April 28, 2008 || Mount Lemmon || Mount Lemmon Survey || — || align=right | 2.1 km || 
|-id=323 bgcolor=#d6d6d6
| 460323 ||  || — || February 24, 2006 || Mount Lemmon || Mount Lemmon Survey || — || align=right | 2.0 km || 
|-id=324 bgcolor=#E9E9E9
| 460324 ||  || — || August 29, 2005 || Kitt Peak || Spacewatch || NEM || align=right | 2.3 km || 
|-id=325 bgcolor=#E9E9E9
| 460325 ||  || — || June 26, 2005 || Mount Lemmon || Mount Lemmon Survey || — || align=right | 1.4 km || 
|-id=326 bgcolor=#d6d6d6
| 460326 ||  || — || May 21, 2012 || Mount Lemmon || Mount Lemmon Survey || 3:2 || align=right | 5.3 km || 
|-id=327 bgcolor=#fefefe
| 460327 ||  || — || November 19, 2003 || Kitt Peak || Spacewatch || — || align=right data-sort-value="0.73" | 730 m || 
|-id=328 bgcolor=#E9E9E9
| 460328 ||  || — || March 27, 2008 || Mount Lemmon || Mount Lemmon Survey || — || align=right | 1.3 km || 
|-id=329 bgcolor=#E9E9E9
| 460329 ||  || — || September 6, 2010 || Kitt Peak || Spacewatch || — || align=right data-sort-value="0.90" | 900 m || 
|-id=330 bgcolor=#E9E9E9
| 460330 ||  || — || October 23, 2005 || Catalina || CSS || — || align=right | 2.4 km || 
|-id=331 bgcolor=#E9E9E9
| 460331 ||  || — || July 12, 2005 || Mount Lemmon || Mount Lemmon Survey || — || align=right | 1.5 km || 
|-id=332 bgcolor=#E9E9E9
| 460332 ||  || — || September 27, 2000 || Socorro || LINEAR || — || align=right | 2.8 km || 
|-id=333 bgcolor=#d6d6d6
| 460333 ||  || — || March 12, 2010 || WISE || WISE || — || align=right | 2.9 km || 
|-id=334 bgcolor=#E9E9E9
| 460334 ||  || — || October 13, 2010 || Kitt Peak || Spacewatch || — || align=right | 1.9 km || 
|-id=335 bgcolor=#d6d6d6
| 460335 ||  || — || December 14, 2004 || Kitt Peak || Spacewatch || — || align=right | 2.1 km || 
|-id=336 bgcolor=#E9E9E9
| 460336 ||  || — || September 11, 2010 || Mount Lemmon || Mount Lemmon Survey || KON || align=right | 2.0 km || 
|-id=337 bgcolor=#E9E9E9
| 460337 ||  || — || April 3, 2008 || Mount Lemmon || Mount Lemmon Survey || — || align=right | 1.6 km || 
|-id=338 bgcolor=#d6d6d6
| 460338 ||  || — || October 24, 2009 || Kitt Peak || Spacewatch || VER || align=right | 2.1 km || 
|-id=339 bgcolor=#d6d6d6
| 460339 ||  || — || September 20, 2003 || Kitt Peak || Spacewatch || — || align=right | 3.4 km || 
|-id=340 bgcolor=#d6d6d6
| 460340 ||  || — || September 27, 2003 || Socorro || LINEAR || — || align=right | 4.3 km || 
|-id=341 bgcolor=#d6d6d6
| 460341 ||  || — || October 20, 2003 || Socorro || LINEAR || THB || align=right | 2.8 km || 
|-id=342 bgcolor=#fefefe
| 460342 ||  || — || November 7, 2007 || Mount Lemmon || Mount Lemmon Survey || MAS || align=right data-sort-value="0.79" | 790 m || 
|-id=343 bgcolor=#E9E9E9
| 460343 ||  || — || November 10, 2005 || Catalina || CSS || DOR || align=right | 2.3 km || 
|-id=344 bgcolor=#E9E9E9
| 460344 ||  || — || September 11, 2010 || Kitt Peak || Spacewatch || — || align=right | 1.3 km || 
|-id=345 bgcolor=#fefefe
| 460345 ||  || — || February 16, 2009 || Kitt Peak || Spacewatch || — || align=right data-sort-value="0.74" | 740 m || 
|-id=346 bgcolor=#fefefe
| 460346 ||  || — || November 19, 2003 || Campo Imperatore || CINEOS || — || align=right data-sort-value="0.78" | 780 m || 
|-id=347 bgcolor=#E9E9E9
| 460347 ||  || — || July 16, 2010 || WISE || WISE || — || align=right | 1.9 km || 
|-id=348 bgcolor=#E9E9E9
| 460348 ||  || — || October 17, 2006 || Catalina || CSS || EUN || align=right | 1.3 km || 
|-id=349 bgcolor=#fefefe
| 460349 ||  || — || October 13, 2007 || Kitt Peak || Spacewatch || — || align=right data-sort-value="0.83" | 830 m || 
|-id=350 bgcolor=#fefefe
| 460350 ||  || — || April 17, 2009 || Mount Lemmon || Mount Lemmon Survey || — || align=right | 1.1 km || 
|-id=351 bgcolor=#fefefe
| 460351 ||  || — || November 20, 2001 || Socorro || LINEAR || — || align=right data-sort-value="0.88" | 880 m || 
|-id=352 bgcolor=#fefefe
| 460352 ||  || — || August 6, 2007 || Siding Spring || SSS || — || align=right data-sort-value="0.99" | 990 m || 
|-id=353 bgcolor=#E9E9E9
| 460353 ||  || — || September 26, 2005 || Kitt Peak || Spacewatch || — || align=right | 1.9 km || 
|-id=354 bgcolor=#E9E9E9
| 460354 ||  || — || February 28, 2008 || Catalina || CSS || — || align=right | 2.9 km || 
|-id=355 bgcolor=#E9E9E9
| 460355 ||  || — || September 11, 2010 || Mount Lemmon || Mount Lemmon Survey || — || align=right | 1.3 km || 
|-id=356 bgcolor=#E9E9E9
| 460356 ||  || — || March 13, 2012 || Mount Lemmon || Mount Lemmon Survey || — || align=right data-sort-value="0.85" | 850 m || 
|-id=357 bgcolor=#E9E9E9
| 460357 ||  || — || November 10, 2010 || Mount Lemmon || Mount Lemmon Survey || — || align=right | 1.2 km || 
|-id=358 bgcolor=#d6d6d6
| 460358 ||  || — || September 19, 2008 || Kitt Peak || Spacewatch || — || align=right | 3.2 km || 
|-id=359 bgcolor=#fefefe
| 460359 ||  || — || June 21, 2010 || Mount Lemmon || Mount Lemmon Survey || — || align=right data-sort-value="0.78" | 780 m || 
|-id=360 bgcolor=#E9E9E9
| 460360 ||  || — || September 19, 2001 || Socorro || LINEAR || — || align=right | 1.5 km || 
|-id=361 bgcolor=#fefefe
| 460361 ||  || — || February 3, 2008 || Mount Lemmon || Mount Lemmon Survey || H || align=right data-sort-value="0.70" | 700 m || 
|-id=362 bgcolor=#fefefe
| 460362 ||  || — || September 28, 2003 || Anderson Mesa || LONEOS || V || align=right data-sort-value="0.73" | 730 m || 
|-id=363 bgcolor=#fefefe
| 460363 ||  || — || December 24, 2011 || Mount Lemmon || Mount Lemmon Survey || — || align=right data-sort-value="0.94" | 940 m || 
|-id=364 bgcolor=#fefefe
| 460364 ||  || — || August 18, 2007 || Anderson Mesa || LONEOS || — || align=right data-sort-value="0.70" | 700 m || 
|-id=365 bgcolor=#d6d6d6
| 460365 ||  || — || August 15, 2009 || Catalina || CSS || — || align=right | 3.2 km || 
|-id=366 bgcolor=#E9E9E9
| 460366 ||  || — || January 9, 2007 || Mount Lemmon || Mount Lemmon Survey || — || align=right | 1.5 km || 
|-id=367 bgcolor=#fefefe
| 460367 ||  || — || May 4, 2005 || Mount Lemmon || Mount Lemmon Survey || — || align=right data-sort-value="0.81" | 810 m || 
|-id=368 bgcolor=#E9E9E9
| 460368 ||  || — || July 5, 2005 || Mount Lemmon || Mount Lemmon Survey || — || align=right | 1.2 km || 
|-id=369 bgcolor=#E9E9E9
| 460369 ||  || — || November 11, 2010 || Mount Lemmon || Mount Lemmon Survey || — || align=right | 1.5 km || 
|-id=370 bgcolor=#E9E9E9
| 460370 ||  || — || October 16, 2006 || Kitt Peak || Spacewatch || — || align=right data-sort-value="0.94" | 940 m || 
|-id=371 bgcolor=#E9E9E9
| 460371 ||  || — || October 9, 2010 || Mount Lemmon || Mount Lemmon Survey || — || align=right | 1.3 km || 
|-id=372 bgcolor=#fefefe
| 460372 ||  || — || February 19, 2009 || Kitt Peak || Spacewatch || — || align=right data-sort-value="0.77" | 770 m || 
|-id=373 bgcolor=#d6d6d6
| 460373 ||  || — || October 18, 2009 || Mount Lemmon || Mount Lemmon Survey || THM || align=right | 1.8 km || 
|-id=374 bgcolor=#E9E9E9
| 460374 ||  || — || March 29, 2008 || Mount Lemmon || Mount Lemmon Survey || — || align=right | 1.5 km || 
|-id=375 bgcolor=#d6d6d6
| 460375 ||  || — || December 14, 2010 || Mount Lemmon || Mount Lemmon Survey || — || align=right | 1.6 km || 
|-id=376 bgcolor=#E9E9E9
| 460376 ||  || — || November 7, 2010 || Kitt Peak || Spacewatch || — || align=right | 1.7 km || 
|-id=377 bgcolor=#E9E9E9
| 460377 ||  || — || February 29, 2008 || Kitt Peak || Spacewatch || — || align=right data-sort-value="0.87" | 870 m || 
|-id=378 bgcolor=#E9E9E9
| 460378 ||  || — || October 2, 2006 || Mount Lemmon || Mount Lemmon Survey || — || align=right data-sort-value="0.86" | 860 m || 
|-id=379 bgcolor=#E9E9E9
| 460379 ||  || — || November 11, 2010 || Mount Lemmon || Mount Lemmon Survey || — || align=right | 1.6 km || 
|-id=380 bgcolor=#E9E9E9
| 460380 ||  || — || September 28, 2006 || Kitt Peak || Spacewatch || — || align=right data-sort-value="0.88" | 880 m || 
|-id=381 bgcolor=#E9E9E9
| 460381 ||  || — || November 1, 2005 || Catalina || CSS || GEF || align=right | 1.2 km || 
|-id=382 bgcolor=#d6d6d6
| 460382 ||  || — || January 16, 2011 || Mount Lemmon || Mount Lemmon Survey || EOS || align=right | 2.1 km || 
|-id=383 bgcolor=#fefefe
| 460383 ||  || — || November 19, 2007 || Mount Lemmon || Mount Lemmon Survey || — || align=right data-sort-value="0.66" | 660 m || 
|-id=384 bgcolor=#E9E9E9
| 460384 ||  || — || February 9, 2008 || Mount Lemmon || Mount Lemmon Survey || — || align=right data-sort-value="0.92" | 920 m || 
|-id=385 bgcolor=#E9E9E9
| 460385 ||  || — || January 29, 2012 || Kitt Peak || Spacewatch || MAR || align=right | 1.0 km || 
|-id=386 bgcolor=#E9E9E9
| 460386 ||  || — || October 30, 2010 || Mount Lemmon || Mount Lemmon Survey || — || align=right | 1.2 km || 
|-id=387 bgcolor=#fefefe
| 460387 ||  || — || March 31, 2013 || Mount Lemmon || Mount Lemmon Survey || — || align=right data-sort-value="0.63" | 630 m || 
|-id=388 bgcolor=#fefefe
| 460388 ||  || — || November 19, 2007 || Mount Lemmon || Mount Lemmon Survey || — || align=right data-sort-value="0.77" | 770 m || 
|-id=389 bgcolor=#fefefe
| 460389 ||  || — || November 15, 2007 || Mount Lemmon || Mount Lemmon Survey || — || align=right data-sort-value="0.79" | 790 m || 
|-id=390 bgcolor=#fefefe
| 460390 ||  || — || November 20, 2003 || Socorro || LINEAR || — || align=right data-sort-value="0.87" | 870 m || 
|-id=391 bgcolor=#E9E9E9
| 460391 ||  || — || October 10, 2005 || Kitt Peak || Spacewatch || — || align=right | 2.0 km || 
|-id=392 bgcolor=#fefefe
| 460392 ||  || — || March 11, 2005 || Mount Lemmon || Mount Lemmon Survey || — || align=right data-sort-value="0.91" | 910 m || 
|-id=393 bgcolor=#E9E9E9
| 460393 ||  || — || October 17, 2010 || Mount Lemmon || Mount Lemmon Survey || MIS || align=right | 2.9 km || 
|-id=394 bgcolor=#fefefe
| 460394 ||  || — || September 9, 2007 || Kitt Peak || Spacewatch || — || align=right data-sort-value="0.81" | 810 m || 
|-id=395 bgcolor=#E9E9E9
| 460395 ||  || — || April 24, 2000 || Kitt Peak || Spacewatch || — || align=right | 1.2 km || 
|-id=396 bgcolor=#d6d6d6
| 460396 ||  || — || January 13, 2004 || Kitt Peak || Spacewatch || — || align=right | 2.4 km || 
|-id=397 bgcolor=#d6d6d6
| 460397 ||  || — || January 26, 2006 || Mount Lemmon || Mount Lemmon Survey || — || align=right | 3.0 km || 
|-id=398 bgcolor=#d6d6d6
| 460398 ||  || — || December 5, 2005 || Mount Lemmon || Mount Lemmon Survey || — || align=right | 2.2 km || 
|-id=399 bgcolor=#E9E9E9
| 460399 ||  || — || May 13, 2004 || Kitt Peak || Spacewatch || — || align=right | 1.5 km || 
|-id=400 bgcolor=#E9E9E9
| 460400 ||  || — || September 10, 2010 || Kitt Peak || Spacewatch || — || align=right data-sort-value="0.97" | 970 m || 
|}

460401–460500 

|-bgcolor=#E9E9E9
| 460401 ||  || — || February 25, 2008 || Mount Lemmon || Mount Lemmon Survey || — || align=right | 1.5 km || 
|-id=402 bgcolor=#fefefe
| 460402 ||  || — || May 3, 2000 || Kitt Peak || Spacewatch || — || align=right data-sort-value="0.71" | 710 m || 
|-id=403 bgcolor=#fefefe
| 460403 ||  || — || September 4, 2003 || Kitt Peak || Spacewatch || — || align=right data-sort-value="0.64" | 640 m || 
|-id=404 bgcolor=#d6d6d6
| 460404 ||  || — || January 22, 2006 || Mount Lemmon || Mount Lemmon Survey || — || align=right | 1.7 km || 
|-id=405 bgcolor=#E9E9E9
| 460405 ||  || — || December 24, 2006 || Kitt Peak || Spacewatch || — || align=right | 1.3 km || 
|-id=406 bgcolor=#d6d6d6
| 460406 ||  || — || October 5, 2004 || Kitt Peak || Spacewatch || KOR || align=right | 1.5 km || 
|-id=407 bgcolor=#E9E9E9
| 460407 ||  || — || October 31, 2005 || Kitt Peak || Spacewatch || HOF || align=right | 3.0 km || 
|-id=408 bgcolor=#fefefe
| 460408 ||  || — || December 16, 2007 || Mount Lemmon || Mount Lemmon Survey || — || align=right data-sort-value="0.68" | 680 m || 
|-id=409 bgcolor=#E9E9E9
| 460409 ||  || — || February 25, 2012 || Kitt Peak || Spacewatch || — || align=right | 2.2 km || 
|-id=410 bgcolor=#d6d6d6
| 460410 ||  || — || September 22, 2003 || Kitt Peak || Spacewatch || THM || align=right | 2.1 km || 
|-id=411 bgcolor=#E9E9E9
| 460411 ||  || — || February 28, 2008 || Kitt Peak || Spacewatch || — || align=right | 1.4 km || 
|-id=412 bgcolor=#fefefe
| 460412 ||  || — || October 13, 2007 || Mount Lemmon || Mount Lemmon Survey || — || align=right data-sort-value="0.73" | 730 m || 
|-id=413 bgcolor=#fefefe
| 460413 ||  || — || September 11, 2007 || Mount Lemmon || Mount Lemmon Survey || — || align=right data-sort-value="0.64" | 640 m || 
|-id=414 bgcolor=#d6d6d6
| 460414 ||  || — || October 17, 2009 || Mount Lemmon || Mount Lemmon Survey || — || align=right | 1.7 km || 
|-id=415 bgcolor=#E9E9E9
| 460415 ||  || — || May 18, 2013 || Mount Lemmon || Mount Lemmon Survey || — || align=right data-sort-value="0.98" | 980 m || 
|-id=416 bgcolor=#d6d6d6
| 460416 ||  || — || September 22, 2009 || Kitt Peak || Spacewatch || — || align=right | 1.9 km || 
|-id=417 bgcolor=#d6d6d6
| 460417 ||  || — || March 9, 2005 || Mount Lemmon || Mount Lemmon Survey || — || align=right | 2.6 km || 
|-id=418 bgcolor=#d6d6d6
| 460418 ||  || — || March 28, 2010 || WISE || WISE || — || align=right | 3.6 km || 
|-id=419 bgcolor=#d6d6d6
| 460419 ||  || — || February 25, 2012 || Kitt Peak || Spacewatch || — || align=right | 3.1 km || 
|-id=420 bgcolor=#fefefe
| 460420 ||  || — || March 16, 2013 || Catalina || CSS || — || align=right | 1.2 km || 
|-id=421 bgcolor=#E9E9E9
| 460421 ||  || — || September 25, 2005 || Kitt Peak || Spacewatch || — || align=right | 2.0 km || 
|-id=422 bgcolor=#E9E9E9
| 460422 ||  || — || March 1, 2008 || Kitt Peak || Spacewatch || — || align=right | 1.1 km || 
|-id=423 bgcolor=#E9E9E9
| 460423 ||  || — || November 3, 2005 || Mount Lemmon || Mount Lemmon Survey || — || align=right | 1.9 km || 
|-id=424 bgcolor=#fefefe
| 460424 ||  || — || October 11, 2007 || Mount Lemmon || Mount Lemmon Survey || — || align=right | 1.0 km || 
|-id=425 bgcolor=#fefefe
| 460425 ||  || — || February 1, 2009 || Kitt Peak || Spacewatch || V || align=right data-sort-value="0.60" | 600 m || 
|-id=426 bgcolor=#E9E9E9
| 460426 ||  || — || November 30, 2005 || Kitt Peak || Spacewatch || — || align=right | 1.8 km || 
|-id=427 bgcolor=#d6d6d6
| 460427 ||  || — || September 15, 2004 || Kitt Peak || Spacewatch || KOR || align=right | 1.1 km || 
|-id=428 bgcolor=#E9E9E9
| 460428 ||  || — || March 26, 2003 || Kitt Peak || Spacewatch || — || align=right | 2.3 km || 
|-id=429 bgcolor=#E9E9E9
| 460429 ||  || — || October 21, 2001 || Kitt Peak || Spacewatch || — || align=right | 1.2 km || 
|-id=430 bgcolor=#d6d6d6
| 460430 ||  || — || October 1, 2008 || Mount Lemmon || Mount Lemmon Survey || — || align=right | 3.7 km || 
|-id=431 bgcolor=#d6d6d6
| 460431 ||  || — || February 27, 2006 || Mount Lemmon || Mount Lemmon Survey || EOS || align=right | 1.8 km || 
|-id=432 bgcolor=#d6d6d6
| 460432 ||  || — || October 30, 2009 || Mount Lemmon || Mount Lemmon Survey || — || align=right | 2.6 km || 
|-id=433 bgcolor=#E9E9E9
| 460433 ||  || — || October 12, 2010 || Mount Lemmon || Mount Lemmon Survey || MAR || align=right data-sort-value="0.97" | 970 m || 
|-id=434 bgcolor=#fefefe
| 460434 ||  || — || October 13, 2007 || Kitt Peak || Spacewatch || — || align=right data-sort-value="0.79" | 790 m || 
|-id=435 bgcolor=#E9E9E9
| 460435 ||  || — || January 27, 2007 || Kitt Peak || Spacewatch || — || align=right | 2.1 km || 
|-id=436 bgcolor=#d6d6d6
| 460436 ||  || — || September 10, 2004 || Kitt Peak || Spacewatch || — || align=right | 2.4 km || 
|-id=437 bgcolor=#d6d6d6
| 460437 ||  || — || February 20, 2010 || WISE || WISE || — || align=right | 3.2 km || 
|-id=438 bgcolor=#fefefe
| 460438 ||  || — || October 21, 2003 || Kitt Peak || Spacewatch || V || align=right data-sort-value="0.62" | 620 m || 
|-id=439 bgcolor=#E9E9E9
| 460439 ||  || — || December 11, 2006 || Kitt Peak || Spacewatch || — || align=right | 1.7 km || 
|-id=440 bgcolor=#E9E9E9
| 460440 ||  || — || August 29, 2005 || Kitt Peak || Spacewatch || — || align=right | 2.0 km || 
|-id=441 bgcolor=#E9E9E9
| 460441 ||  || — || October 11, 2010 || Kitt Peak || Spacewatch || — || align=right data-sort-value="0.90" | 900 m || 
|-id=442 bgcolor=#E9E9E9
| 460442 ||  || — || February 28, 2008 || Kitt Peak || Spacewatch || — || align=right | 1.7 km || 
|-id=443 bgcolor=#fefefe
| 460443 ||  || — || October 16, 2007 || Mount Lemmon || Mount Lemmon Survey || — || align=right data-sort-value="0.95" | 950 m || 
|-id=444 bgcolor=#fefefe
| 460444 ||  || — || May 9, 2006 || Mount Lemmon || Mount Lemmon Survey || — || align=right data-sort-value="0.67" | 670 m || 
|-id=445 bgcolor=#E9E9E9
| 460445 ||  || — || December 1, 2006 || Mount Lemmon || Mount Lemmon Survey || — || align=right | 1.4 km || 
|-id=446 bgcolor=#E9E9E9
| 460446 ||  || — || December 3, 2010 || Kitt Peak || Spacewatch || — || align=right | 1.8 km || 
|-id=447 bgcolor=#E9E9E9
| 460447 ||  || — || February 11, 2002 || Socorro || LINEAR || — || align=right | 2.9 km || 
|-id=448 bgcolor=#E9E9E9
| 460448 ||  || — || November 2, 2010 || Kitt Peak || Spacewatch || — || align=right | 1.7 km || 
|-id=449 bgcolor=#d6d6d6
| 460449 ||  || — || January 31, 2006 || Kitt Peak || Spacewatch || — || align=right | 3.3 km || 
|-id=450 bgcolor=#d6d6d6
| 460450 ||  || — || January 12, 2010 || Mount Lemmon || Mount Lemmon Survey || — || align=right | 2.5 km || 
|-id=451 bgcolor=#d6d6d6
| 460451 ||  || — || April 29, 2012 || Kitt Peak || Spacewatch || BRA || align=right | 1.6 km || 
|-id=452 bgcolor=#E9E9E9
| 460452 ||  || — || November 4, 2005 || Mount Lemmon || Mount Lemmon Survey || — || align=right | 2.8 km || 
|-id=453 bgcolor=#fefefe
| 460453 ||  || — || May 7, 2002 || Anderson Mesa || LONEOS || — || align=right | 1.2 km || 
|-id=454 bgcolor=#d6d6d6
| 460454 ||  || — || November 16, 2009 || Mount Lemmon || Mount Lemmon Survey || — || align=right | 2.7 km || 
|-id=455 bgcolor=#fefefe
| 460455 ||  || — || October 17, 1995 || Kitt Peak || Spacewatch || — || align=right data-sort-value="0.88" | 880 m || 
|-id=456 bgcolor=#E9E9E9
| 460456 ||  || — || August 30, 2005 || Kitt Peak || Spacewatch || — || align=right | 1.5 km || 
|-id=457 bgcolor=#d6d6d6
| 460457 ||  || — || November 6, 2008 || Catalina || CSS || 7:4 || align=right | 4.0 km || 
|-id=458 bgcolor=#E9E9E9
| 460458 ||  || — || March 30, 2008 || Kitt Peak || Spacewatch || — || align=right | 1.3 km || 
|-id=459 bgcolor=#d6d6d6
| 460459 ||  || — || October 14, 2009 || Mount Lemmon || Mount Lemmon Survey || — || align=right | 2.3 km || 
|-id=460 bgcolor=#d6d6d6
| 460460 ||  || — || September 28, 1997 || Kitt Peak || Spacewatch || — || align=right | 2.3 km || 
|-id=461 bgcolor=#fefefe
| 460461 ||  || — || August 23, 2004 || Kitt Peak || Spacewatch || — || align=right data-sort-value="0.60" | 600 m || 
|-id=462 bgcolor=#E9E9E9
| 460462 ||  || — || August 28, 2005 || Kitt Peak || Spacewatch || — || align=right | 1.8 km || 
|-id=463 bgcolor=#E9E9E9
| 460463 ||  || — || January 28, 2007 || Kitt Peak || Spacewatch || — || align=right | 2.1 km || 
|-id=464 bgcolor=#fefefe
| 460464 ||  || — || May 11, 2010 || Mount Lemmon || Mount Lemmon Survey || — || align=right data-sort-value="0.87" | 870 m || 
|-id=465 bgcolor=#fefefe
| 460465 ||  || — || January 31, 2009 || Mount Lemmon || Mount Lemmon Survey || — || align=right data-sort-value="0.99" | 990 m || 
|-id=466 bgcolor=#E9E9E9
| 460466 ||  || — || July 31, 2009 || Siding Spring || SSS || — || align=right | 2.5 km || 
|-id=467 bgcolor=#fefefe
| 460467 ||  || — || May 7, 2010 || Mount Lemmon || Mount Lemmon Survey || — || align=right data-sort-value="0.61" | 610 m || 
|-id=468 bgcolor=#E9E9E9
| 460468 ||  || — || November 3, 2005 || Mount Lemmon || Mount Lemmon Survey || — || align=right | 2.6 km || 
|-id=469 bgcolor=#d6d6d6
| 460469 ||  || — || October 23, 2003 || Kitt Peak || Spacewatch || — || align=right | 2.7 km || 
|-id=470 bgcolor=#d6d6d6
| 460470 ||  || — || December 20, 2009 || Catalina || CSS || — || align=right | 3.7 km || 
|-id=471 bgcolor=#fefefe
| 460471 ||  || — || February 20, 2009 || Mount Lemmon || Mount Lemmon Survey || — || align=right data-sort-value="0.81" | 810 m || 
|-id=472 bgcolor=#d6d6d6
| 460472 ||  || — || July 29, 2008 || Kitt Peak || Spacewatch || — || align=right | 3.0 km || 
|-id=473 bgcolor=#d6d6d6
| 460473 ||  || — || April 29, 2008 || Mount Lemmon || Mount Lemmon Survey || — || align=right | 3.1 km || 
|-id=474 bgcolor=#fefefe
| 460474 ||  || — || April 25, 2006 || Mount Lemmon || Mount Lemmon Survey || V || align=right data-sort-value="0.59" | 590 m || 
|-id=475 bgcolor=#d6d6d6
| 460475 ||  || — || October 20, 2003 || Kitt Peak || Spacewatch || — || align=right | 2.0 km || 
|-id=476 bgcolor=#d6d6d6
| 460476 ||  || — || January 28, 2011 || Kitt Peak || Spacewatch || — || align=right | 2.7 km || 
|-id=477 bgcolor=#E9E9E9
| 460477 ||  || — || May 3, 2013 || Mount Lemmon || Mount Lemmon Survey || — || align=right | 1.1 km || 
|-id=478 bgcolor=#E9E9E9
| 460478 ||  || — || October 27, 2005 || Kitt Peak || Spacewatch || — || align=right | 2.5 km || 
|-id=479 bgcolor=#d6d6d6
| 460479 ||  || — || December 1, 2005 || Kitt Peak || Spacewatch || KOR || align=right | 1.6 km || 
|-id=480 bgcolor=#d6d6d6
| 460480 ||  || — || November 9, 2009 || Kitt Peak || Spacewatch || — || align=right | 3.2 km || 
|-id=481 bgcolor=#fefefe
| 460481 ||  || — || March 18, 2010 || Kitt Peak || Spacewatch || — || align=right data-sort-value="0.75" | 750 m || 
|-id=482 bgcolor=#fefefe
| 460482 ||  || — || October 23, 1995 || Kitt Peak || Spacewatch || NYS || align=right data-sort-value="0.69" | 690 m || 
|-id=483 bgcolor=#d6d6d6
| 460483 ||  || — || September 18, 2009 || Mount Lemmon || Mount Lemmon Survey || — || align=right | 2.1 km || 
|-id=484 bgcolor=#fefefe
| 460484 ||  || — || September 9, 2007 || Kitt Peak || Spacewatch || — || align=right data-sort-value="0.93" | 930 m || 
|-id=485 bgcolor=#d6d6d6
| 460485 ||  || — || January 14, 2010 || WISE || WISE || — || align=right | 1.9 km || 
|-id=486 bgcolor=#d6d6d6
| 460486 ||  || — || September 22, 2009 || Catalina || CSS || — || align=right | 2.9 km || 
|-id=487 bgcolor=#d6d6d6
| 460487 ||  || — || February 9, 2010 || Mount Lemmon || Mount Lemmon Survey || Tj (2.99) || align=right | 3.7 km || 
|-id=488 bgcolor=#d6d6d6
| 460488 ||  || — || March 3, 2010 || WISE || WISE || — || align=right | 3.5 km || 
|-id=489 bgcolor=#fefefe
| 460489 ||  || — || October 29, 1999 || Kitt Peak || Spacewatch || — || align=right data-sort-value="0.94" | 940 m || 
|-id=490 bgcolor=#d6d6d6
| 460490 ||  || — || August 28, 2009 || Kitt Peak || Spacewatch || — || align=right | 3.4 km || 
|-id=491 bgcolor=#d6d6d6
| 460491 ||  || — || September 5, 2008 || Kitt Peak || Spacewatch || — || align=right | 3.4 km || 
|-id=492 bgcolor=#d6d6d6
| 460492 ||  || — || October 8, 2008 || Kitt Peak || Spacewatch || EOS || align=right | 2.4 km || 
|-id=493 bgcolor=#d6d6d6
| 460493 ||  || — || December 1, 2003 || Kitt Peak || Spacewatch || EOS || align=right | 2.1 km || 
|-id=494 bgcolor=#fefefe
| 460494 ||  || — || February 20, 2009 || Kitt Peak || Spacewatch || — || align=right data-sort-value="0.88" | 880 m || 
|-id=495 bgcolor=#d6d6d6
| 460495 ||  || — || February 23, 2012 || Mount Lemmon || Mount Lemmon Survey || — || align=right | 3.5 km || 
|-id=496 bgcolor=#fefefe
| 460496 ||  || — || October 2, 2003 || Kitt Peak || Spacewatch || — || align=right data-sort-value="0.96" | 960 m || 
|-id=497 bgcolor=#E9E9E9
| 460497 ||  || — || November 22, 2006 || Kitt Peak || Spacewatch || (5) || align=right data-sort-value="0.80" | 800 m || 
|-id=498 bgcolor=#d6d6d6
| 460498 ||  || — || November 10, 2009 || Mount Lemmon || Mount Lemmon Survey || — || align=right | 2.3 km || 
|-id=499 bgcolor=#E9E9E9
| 460499 ||  || — || November 8, 2010 || Kitt Peak || Spacewatch || — || align=right | 1.3 km || 
|-id=500 bgcolor=#d6d6d6
| 460500 ||  || — || October 3, 2008 || Mount Lemmon || Mount Lemmon Survey || 7:4 || align=right | 3.8 km || 
|}

460501–460600 

|-bgcolor=#E9E9E9
| 460501 ||  || — || September 20, 2000 || Kitt Peak || Spacewatch || HOF || align=right | 3.2 km || 
|-id=502 bgcolor=#d6d6d6
| 460502 ||  || — || March 1, 2010 || WISE || WISE || — || align=right | 3.3 km || 
|-id=503 bgcolor=#d6d6d6
| 460503 ||  || — || September 5, 2008 || Kitt Peak || Spacewatch || — || align=right | 2.8 km || 
|-id=504 bgcolor=#d6d6d6
| 460504 ||  || — || March 27, 2010 || WISE || WISE || — || align=right | 3.1 km || 
|-id=505 bgcolor=#E9E9E9
| 460505 ||  || — || May 27, 2008 || Kitt Peak || Spacewatch || AGN || align=right | 1.1 km || 
|-id=506 bgcolor=#E9E9E9
| 460506 ||  || — || January 10, 1997 || Kitt Peak || Spacewatch || — || align=right | 2.4 km || 
|-id=507 bgcolor=#d6d6d6
| 460507 ||  || — || April 12, 2010 || WISE || WISE || — || align=right | 3.1 km || 
|-id=508 bgcolor=#d6d6d6
| 460508 ||  || — || September 28, 2003 || Kitt Peak || Spacewatch || — || align=right | 3.0 km || 
|-id=509 bgcolor=#d6d6d6
| 460509 ||  || — || October 27, 2009 || Mount Lemmon || Mount Lemmon Survey || — || align=right | 4.2 km || 
|-id=510 bgcolor=#d6d6d6
| 460510 ||  || — || December 22, 2005 || Kitt Peak || Spacewatch || — || align=right | 2.3 km || 
|-id=511 bgcolor=#d6d6d6
| 460511 ||  || — || January 5, 2011 || Catalina || CSS || — || align=right | 3.3 km || 
|-id=512 bgcolor=#E9E9E9
| 460512 ||  || — || October 17, 2010 || Mount Lemmon || Mount Lemmon Survey || — || align=right | 1.1 km || 
|-id=513 bgcolor=#E9E9E9
| 460513 ||  || — || November 27, 2010 || Mount Lemmon || Mount Lemmon Survey || — || align=right | 2.4 km || 
|-id=514 bgcolor=#d6d6d6
| 460514 ||  || — || October 1, 2003 || Kitt Peak || Spacewatch || — || align=right | 3.0 km || 
|-id=515 bgcolor=#d6d6d6
| 460515 ||  || — || March 14, 2010 || WISE || WISE || — || align=right | 3.5 km || 
|-id=516 bgcolor=#E9E9E9
| 460516 ||  || — || April 5, 2008 || Mount Lemmon || Mount Lemmon Survey || — || align=right | 1.5 km || 
|-id=517 bgcolor=#d6d6d6
| 460517 ||  || — || November 23, 2009 || Kitt Peak || Spacewatch || EOS || align=right | 4.3 km || 
|-id=518 bgcolor=#E9E9E9
| 460518 ||  || — || March 15, 2008 || Kitt Peak || Spacewatch || — || align=right | 1.7 km || 
|-id=519 bgcolor=#d6d6d6
| 460519 ||  || — || November 11, 2009 || Kitt Peak || Spacewatch || — || align=right | 3.1 km || 
|-id=520 bgcolor=#d6d6d6
| 460520 ||  || — || February 15, 2010 || WISE || WISE || — || align=right | 2.7 km || 
|-id=521 bgcolor=#E9E9E9
| 460521 ||  || — || October 5, 2005 || Kitt Peak || Spacewatch || — || align=right | 1.5 km || 
|-id=522 bgcolor=#d6d6d6
| 460522 ||  || — || October 24, 2003 || Kitt Peak || Spacewatch || — || align=right | 3.1 km || 
|-id=523 bgcolor=#fefefe
| 460523 ||  || — || November 30, 2011 || Kitt Peak || Spacewatch || — || align=right data-sort-value="0.83" | 830 m || 
|-id=524 bgcolor=#d6d6d6
| 460524 ||  || — || December 26, 2005 || Kitt Peak || Spacewatch || — || align=right | 2.2 km || 
|-id=525 bgcolor=#fefefe
| 460525 ||  || — || August 8, 2004 || Socorro || LINEAR || — || align=right data-sort-value="0.72" | 720 m || 
|-id=526 bgcolor=#d6d6d6
| 460526 ||  || — || October 17, 2003 || Kitt Peak || Spacewatch || — || align=right | 2.6 km || 
|-id=527 bgcolor=#E9E9E9
| 460527 ||  || — || October 1, 2005 || Catalina || CSS || — || align=right | 2.1 km || 
|-id=528 bgcolor=#fefefe
| 460528 ||  || — || December 5, 2007 || Kitt Peak || Spacewatch || — || align=right data-sort-value="0.90" | 900 m || 
|-id=529 bgcolor=#d6d6d6
| 460529 ||  || — || March 17, 2010 || WISE || WISE || — || align=right | 2.9 km || 
|-id=530 bgcolor=#d6d6d6
| 460530 ||  || — || February 2, 2006 || Kitt Peak || Spacewatch || — || align=right | 3.7 km || 
|-id=531 bgcolor=#d6d6d6
| 460531 ||  || — || January 29, 2011 || Mount Lemmon || Mount Lemmon Survey || — || align=right | 2.7 km || 
|-id=532 bgcolor=#E9E9E9
| 460532 ||  || — || November 30, 2010 || Mount Lemmon || Mount Lemmon Survey || — || align=right | 1.5 km || 
|-id=533 bgcolor=#d6d6d6
| 460533 ||  || — || March 16, 2007 || Kitt Peak || Spacewatch || — || align=right | 2.3 km || 
|-id=534 bgcolor=#d6d6d6
| 460534 ||  || — || September 6, 2008 || Mount Lemmon || Mount Lemmon Survey || — || align=right | 3.3 km || 
|-id=535 bgcolor=#E9E9E9
| 460535 ||  || — || December 6, 2005 || Kitt Peak || Spacewatch || AGN || align=right | 1.1 km || 
|-id=536 bgcolor=#E9E9E9
| 460536 ||  || — || October 10, 2005 || Kitt Peak || Spacewatch || — || align=right | 2.0 km || 
|-id=537 bgcolor=#d6d6d6
| 460537 ||  || — || December 18, 2003 || Kitt Peak || Spacewatch || — || align=right | 3.5 km || 
|-id=538 bgcolor=#d6d6d6
| 460538 ||  || — || April 20, 2010 || WISE || WISE || — || align=right | 5.0 km || 
|-id=539 bgcolor=#E9E9E9
| 460539 ||  || — || August 15, 2009 || Siding Spring || SSS || — || align=right | 3.2 km || 
|-id=540 bgcolor=#d6d6d6
| 460540 ||  || — || September 15, 2009 || Kitt Peak || Spacewatch || — || align=right | 2.3 km || 
|-id=541 bgcolor=#E9E9E9
| 460541 ||  || — || May 7, 2000 || Kitt Peak || Spacewatch || — || align=right | 1.3 km || 
|-id=542 bgcolor=#d6d6d6
| 460542 ||  || — || October 18, 2003 || Kitt Peak || Spacewatch || THM || align=right | 2.4 km || 
|-id=543 bgcolor=#fefefe
| 460543 ||  || — || October 8, 2004 || Kitt Peak || Spacewatch || — || align=right data-sort-value="0.76" | 760 m || 
|-id=544 bgcolor=#d6d6d6
| 460544 ||  || — || October 2, 2003 || Kitt Peak || Spacewatch || — || align=right | 2.8 km || 
|-id=545 bgcolor=#d6d6d6
| 460545 ||  || — || September 27, 2008 || Mount Lemmon || Mount Lemmon Survey || — || align=right | 3.5 km || 
|-id=546 bgcolor=#E9E9E9
| 460546 ||  || — || January 3, 2003 || Socorro || LINEAR || EUN || align=right | 1.7 km || 
|-id=547 bgcolor=#d6d6d6
| 460547 ||  || — || November 18, 2009 || Kitt Peak || Spacewatch || — || align=right | 3.2 km || 
|-id=548 bgcolor=#E9E9E9
| 460548 ||  || — || December 6, 2010 || Mount Lemmon || Mount Lemmon Survey || (5) || align=right data-sort-value="0.93" | 930 m || 
|-id=549 bgcolor=#E9E9E9
| 460549 ||  || — || May 2, 2008 || Kitt Peak || Spacewatch || — || align=right | 1.4 km || 
|-id=550 bgcolor=#d6d6d6
| 460550 ||  || — || June 9, 2012 || Mount Lemmon || Mount Lemmon Survey || — || align=right | 2.9 km || 
|-id=551 bgcolor=#d6d6d6
| 460551 ||  || — || September 22, 2009 || Catalina || CSS || BRA || align=right | 1.3 km || 
|-id=552 bgcolor=#d6d6d6
| 460552 ||  || — || October 19, 2003 || Kitt Peak || Spacewatch || — || align=right | 2.8 km || 
|-id=553 bgcolor=#d6d6d6
| 460553 ||  || — || November 20, 2003 || Kitt Peak || Spacewatch || — || align=right | 2.7 km || 
|-id=554 bgcolor=#d6d6d6
| 460554 ||  || — || November 20, 2003 || Kitt Peak || Spacewatch || — || align=right | 2.8 km || 
|-id=555 bgcolor=#d6d6d6
| 460555 ||  || — || April 1, 2010 || WISE || WISE || — || align=right | 4.4 km || 
|-id=556 bgcolor=#d6d6d6
| 460556 ||  || — || March 25, 2006 || Kitt Peak || Spacewatch || Tj (2.99) || align=right | 4.0 km || 
|-id=557 bgcolor=#d6d6d6
| 460557 ||  || — || October 19, 2003 || Kitt Peak || Spacewatch || — || align=right | 2.6 km || 
|-id=558 bgcolor=#fefefe
| 460558 ||  || — || September 14, 2007 || Mount Lemmon || Mount Lemmon Survey || — || align=right data-sort-value="0.89" | 890 m || 
|-id=559 bgcolor=#E9E9E9
| 460559 ||  || — || March 27, 2012 || Catalina || CSS || — || align=right | 2.4 km || 
|-id=560 bgcolor=#E9E9E9
| 460560 ||  || — || September 18, 2010 || Mount Lemmon || Mount Lemmon Survey || EUN || align=right | 1.4 km || 
|-id=561 bgcolor=#d6d6d6
| 460561 ||  || — || October 21, 2008 || Mount Lemmon || Mount Lemmon Survey || VER || align=right | 2.7 km || 
|-id=562 bgcolor=#fefefe
| 460562 ||  || — || August 17, 1999 || Kitt Peak || Spacewatch || — || align=right data-sort-value="0.68" | 680 m || 
|-id=563 bgcolor=#E9E9E9
| 460563 ||  || — || September 28, 2009 || Kitt Peak || Spacewatch || — || align=right | 2.6 km || 
|-id=564 bgcolor=#E9E9E9
| 460564 ||  || — || June 18, 2005 || Mount Lemmon || Mount Lemmon Survey || — || align=right | 1.2 km || 
|-id=565 bgcolor=#d6d6d6
| 460565 ||  || — || May 24, 2007 || Mount Lemmon || Mount Lemmon Survey || — || align=right | 3.0 km || 
|-id=566 bgcolor=#d6d6d6
| 460566 ||  || — || October 24, 2008 || Kitt Peak || Spacewatch || 7:4 || align=right | 3.4 km || 
|-id=567 bgcolor=#E9E9E9
| 460567 ||  || — || November 4, 2005 || Kitt Peak || Spacewatch || — || align=right | 2.3 km || 
|-id=568 bgcolor=#d6d6d6
| 460568 ||  || — || October 23, 2003 || Kitt Peak || Spacewatch || — || align=right | 3.1 km || 
|-id=569 bgcolor=#d6d6d6
| 460569 ||  || — || November 15, 2003 || Kitt Peak || Spacewatch || — || align=right | 2.3 km || 
|-id=570 bgcolor=#d6d6d6
| 460570 ||  || — || March 3, 2006 || Catalina || CSS || EOS || align=right | 2.5 km || 
|-id=571 bgcolor=#d6d6d6
| 460571 ||  || — || November 20, 2001 || Socorro || LINEAR || 7:4 || align=right | 5.4 km || 
|-id=572 bgcolor=#E9E9E9
| 460572 ||  || — || November 21, 1995 || Kitt Peak || Spacewatch || — || align=right | 2.4 km || 
|-id=573 bgcolor=#d6d6d6
| 460573 ||  || — || September 30, 2003 || Kitt Peak || Spacewatch || EOS || align=right | 1.3 km || 
|-id=574 bgcolor=#E9E9E9
| 460574 ||  || — || February 8, 2007 || Mount Lemmon || Mount Lemmon Survey || — || align=right | 1.4 km || 
|-id=575 bgcolor=#d6d6d6
| 460575 ||  || — || October 18, 2003 || Kitt Peak || Spacewatch || — || align=right | 2.2 km || 
|-id=576 bgcolor=#E9E9E9
| 460576 ||  || — || August 16, 2009 || Kitt Peak || Spacewatch || — || align=right | 1.9 km || 
|-id=577 bgcolor=#d6d6d6
| 460577 ||  || — || February 20, 2006 || Kitt Peak || Spacewatch || — || align=right | 2.5 km || 
|-id=578 bgcolor=#d6d6d6
| 460578 ||  || — || September 19, 2003 || Kitt Peak || Spacewatch || EOS || align=right | 1.6 km || 
|-id=579 bgcolor=#E9E9E9
| 460579 ||  || — || September 29, 2005 || Kitt Peak || Spacewatch || MRX || align=right | 1.1 km || 
|-id=580 bgcolor=#E9E9E9
| 460580 ||  || — || March 13, 2007 || Catalina || CSS || — || align=right | 3.2 km || 
|-id=581 bgcolor=#d6d6d6
| 460581 ||  || — || September 21, 2003 || Kitt Peak || Spacewatch || — || align=right | 3.2 km || 
|-id=582 bgcolor=#E9E9E9
| 460582 ||  || — || October 26, 2005 || Kitt Peak || Spacewatch || — || align=right | 1.8 km || 
|-id=583 bgcolor=#E9E9E9
| 460583 ||  || — || December 29, 2005 || Mount Lemmon || Mount Lemmon Survey ||  || align=right | 2.9 km || 
|-id=584 bgcolor=#E9E9E9
| 460584 ||  || — || September 23, 2005 || Kitt Peak || Spacewatch || — || align=right | 1.6 km || 
|-id=585 bgcolor=#fefefe
| 460585 ||  || — || March 26, 2009 || Kitt Peak || Spacewatch || — || align=right data-sort-value="0.80" | 800 m || 
|-id=586 bgcolor=#d6d6d6
| 460586 ||  || — || November 15, 2003 || Kitt Peak || Spacewatch ||  || align=right | 3.5 km || 
|-id=587 bgcolor=#d6d6d6
| 460587 ||  || — || May 20, 2006 || Kitt Peak || Spacewatch || — || align=right | 3.2 km || 
|-id=588 bgcolor=#d6d6d6
| 460588 ||  || — || October 25, 2008 || Mount Lemmon || Mount Lemmon Survey || 7:4 || align=right | 2.7 km || 
|-id=589 bgcolor=#d6d6d6
| 460589 ||  || — || January 13, 2005 || Kitt Peak || Spacewatch || — || align=right | 2.5 km || 
|-id=590 bgcolor=#E9E9E9
| 460590 ||  || — || December 28, 2005 || Mount Lemmon || Mount Lemmon Survey || — || align=right | 2.4 km || 
|-id=591 bgcolor=#fefefe
| 460591 ||  || — || October 9, 2004 || Kitt Peak || Spacewatch || — || align=right data-sort-value="0.68" | 680 m || 
|-id=592 bgcolor=#d6d6d6
| 460592 ||  || — || October 8, 2008 || Mount Lemmon || Mount Lemmon Survey || EOS || align=right | 2.5 km || 
|-id=593 bgcolor=#d6d6d6
| 460593 ||  || — || May 3, 2005 || Kitt Peak || Spacewatch || Tj (2.99) || align=right | 4.0 km || 
|-id=594 bgcolor=#E9E9E9
| 460594 ||  || — || November 3, 2005 || Catalina || CSS || — || align=right | 1.9 km || 
|-id=595 bgcolor=#E9E9E9
| 460595 ||  || — || December 27, 2005 || Mount Lemmon || Mount Lemmon Survey || — || align=right | 2.1 km || 
|-id=596 bgcolor=#E9E9E9
| 460596 ||  || — || September 26, 2005 || Kitt Peak || Spacewatch || WIT || align=right | 1.1 km || 
|-id=597 bgcolor=#d6d6d6
| 460597 ||  || — || March 4, 2005 || Mount Lemmon || Mount Lemmon Survey || — || align=right | 2.7 km || 
|-id=598 bgcolor=#fefefe
| 460598 ||  || — || September 14, 2006 || Catalina || CSS || MAS || align=right data-sort-value="0.76" | 760 m || 
|-id=599 bgcolor=#d6d6d6
| 460599 ||  || — || October 25, 2003 || Kitt Peak || Spacewatch || — || align=right | 2.7 km || 
|-id=600 bgcolor=#d6d6d6
| 460600 ||  || — || November 14, 1995 || Kitt Peak || Spacewatch || 7:4 || align=right | 3.8 km || 
|}

460601–460700 

|-bgcolor=#E9E9E9
| 460601 ||  || — || November 23, 2006 || Mount Lemmon || Mount Lemmon Survey || — || align=right | 1.5 km || 
|-id=602 bgcolor=#fefefe
| 460602 ||  || — || October 8, 2010 || Kitt Peak || Spacewatch || — || align=right data-sort-value="0.76" | 760 m || 
|-id=603 bgcolor=#d6d6d6
| 460603 ||  || — || July 25, 2008 || Mount Lemmon || Mount Lemmon Survey || — || align=right | 2.7 km || 
|-id=604 bgcolor=#d6d6d6
| 460604 ||  || — || March 12, 2010 || WISE || WISE || — || align=right | 4.7 km || 
|-id=605 bgcolor=#E9E9E9
| 460605 ||  || — || September 17, 2009 || Kitt Peak || Spacewatch || — || align=right | 2.3 km || 
|-id=606 bgcolor=#d6d6d6
| 460606 ||  || — || November 11, 2004 || Kitt Peak || Spacewatch || — || align=right | 2.4 km || 
|-id=607 bgcolor=#E9E9E9
| 460607 ||  || — || November 6, 2005 || Mount Lemmon || Mount Lemmon Survey || — || align=right | 2.2 km || 
|-id=608 bgcolor=#d6d6d6
| 460608 ||  || — || February 28, 2010 || WISE || WISE || — || align=right | 3.3 km || 
|-id=609 bgcolor=#fefefe
| 460609 ||  || — || October 14, 2007 || Mount Lemmon || Mount Lemmon Survey || — || align=right data-sort-value="0.64" | 640 m || 
|-id=610 bgcolor=#d6d6d6
| 460610 ||  || — || October 8, 2008 || Mount Lemmon || Mount Lemmon Survey || — || align=right | 3.4 km || 
|-id=611 bgcolor=#E9E9E9
| 460611 ||  || — || October 24, 2005 || Kitt Peak || Spacewatch || — || align=right | 2.0 km || 
|-id=612 bgcolor=#d6d6d6
| 460612 ||  || — || September 23, 2008 || Kitt Peak || Spacewatch || EOS || align=right | 1.8 km || 
|-id=613 bgcolor=#d6d6d6
| 460613 ||  || — || October 29, 2003 || Kitt Peak || Spacewatch || — || align=right | 2.4 km || 
|-id=614 bgcolor=#E9E9E9
| 460614 ||  || — || April 12, 2004 || Kitt Peak || Spacewatch || MIS || align=right | 2.6 km || 
|-id=615 bgcolor=#E9E9E9
| 460615 ||  || — || November 20, 2006 || Kitt Peak || Spacewatch || — || align=right | 1.0 km || 
|-id=616 bgcolor=#d6d6d6
| 460616 ||  || — || November 8, 2008 || Kitt Peak || Spacewatch || 7:4 || align=right | 4.7 km || 
|-id=617 bgcolor=#d6d6d6
| 460617 ||  || — || March 11, 2007 || Mount Lemmon || Mount Lemmon Survey || KOR || align=right | 1.4 km || 
|-id=618 bgcolor=#d6d6d6
| 460618 ||  || — || March 15, 2007 || Kitt Peak || Spacewatch || — || align=right | 2.7 km || 
|-id=619 bgcolor=#E9E9E9
| 460619 ||  || — || November 14, 1995 || Kitt Peak || Spacewatch || — || align=right | 2.3 km || 
|-id=620 bgcolor=#d6d6d6
| 460620 ||  || — || March 3, 2010 || WISE || WISE || — || align=right | 3.4 km || 
|-id=621 bgcolor=#d6d6d6
| 460621 ||  || — || November 8, 2009 || Mount Lemmon || Mount Lemmon Survey || — || align=right | 2.2 km || 
|-id=622 bgcolor=#d6d6d6
| 460622 ||  || — || September 19, 2003 || Kitt Peak || Spacewatch || — || align=right | 2.7 km || 
|-id=623 bgcolor=#d6d6d6
| 460623 ||  || — || September 24, 2008 || Mount Lemmon || Mount Lemmon Survey || — || align=right | 2.5 km || 
|-id=624 bgcolor=#d6d6d6
| 460624 ||  || — || May 2, 2006 || Kitt Peak || Spacewatch || — || align=right | 3.3 km || 
|-id=625 bgcolor=#d6d6d6
| 460625 ||  || — || October 1, 2003 || Kitt Peak || Spacewatch || — || align=right | 2.3 km || 
|-id=626 bgcolor=#E9E9E9
| 460626 ||  || — || February 8, 2007 || Mount Lemmon || Mount Lemmon Survey || — || align=right | 1.5 km || 
|-id=627 bgcolor=#d6d6d6
| 460627 ||  || — || October 1, 2008 || Mount Lemmon || Mount Lemmon Survey || — || align=right | 2.4 km || 
|-id=628 bgcolor=#d6d6d6
| 460628 ||  || — || September 19, 2009 || Mount Lemmon || Mount Lemmon Survey || — || align=right | 2.2 km || 
|-id=629 bgcolor=#d6d6d6
| 460629 ||  || — || March 25, 2006 || Mount Lemmon || Mount Lemmon Survey || — || align=right | 3.2 km || 
|-id=630 bgcolor=#d6d6d6
| 460630 ||  || — || April 30, 2006 || Kitt Peak || Spacewatch || — || align=right | 2.9 km || 
|-id=631 bgcolor=#d6d6d6
| 460631 ||  || — || December 8, 2010 || Kitt Peak || Spacewatch || — || align=right | 2.1 km || 
|-id=632 bgcolor=#E9E9E9
| 460632 ||  || — || September 29, 2005 || Mount Lemmon || Mount Lemmon Survey || — || align=right | 1.9 km || 
|-id=633 bgcolor=#E9E9E9
| 460633 ||  || — || September 24, 2009 || Mount Lemmon || Mount Lemmon Survey || — || align=right | 1.8 km || 
|-id=634 bgcolor=#d6d6d6
| 460634 ||  || — || October 21, 2003 || Kitt Peak || Spacewatch || — || align=right | 2.8 km || 
|-id=635 bgcolor=#d6d6d6
| 460635 ||  || — || October 25, 2009 || Kitt Peak || Spacewatch || EOS || align=right | 2.5 km || 
|-id=636 bgcolor=#E9E9E9
| 460636 ||  || — || April 13, 2004 || Kitt Peak || Spacewatch || — || align=right data-sort-value="0.98" | 980 m || 
|-id=637 bgcolor=#E9E9E9
| 460637 ||  || — || March 31, 2003 || Kitt Peak || Spacewatch || — || align=right | 3.0 km || 
|-id=638 bgcolor=#d6d6d6
| 460638 ||  || — || January 23, 2006 || Kitt Peak || Spacewatch || — || align=right | 2.4 km || 
|-id=639 bgcolor=#d6d6d6
| 460639 ||  || — || November 30, 2003 || Kitt Peak || Spacewatch || — || align=right | 2.9 km || 
|-id=640 bgcolor=#d6d6d6
| 460640 ||  || — || February 25, 2006 || Kitt Peak || Spacewatch || — || align=right | 2.2 km || 
|-id=641 bgcolor=#fefefe
| 460641 ||  || — || September 13, 2004 || Anderson Mesa || LONEOS || — || align=right data-sort-value="0.81" | 810 m || 
|-id=642 bgcolor=#fefefe
| 460642 ||  || — || December 4, 2007 || Mount Lemmon || Mount Lemmon Survey || NYS || align=right data-sort-value="0.63" | 630 m || 
|-id=643 bgcolor=#d6d6d6
| 460643 ||  || — || April 9, 2010 || WISE || WISE || THB || align=right | 3.1 km || 
|-id=644 bgcolor=#d6d6d6
| 460644 ||  || — || April 29, 2012 || Mount Lemmon || Mount Lemmon Survey || — || align=right | 2.7 km || 
|-id=645 bgcolor=#d6d6d6
| 460645 ||  || — || September 28, 2003 || Kitt Peak || Spacewatch || — || align=right | 2.0 km || 
|-id=646 bgcolor=#d6d6d6
| 460646 ||  || — || September 22, 2008 || Mount Lemmon || Mount Lemmon Survey ||  || align=right | 3.5 km || 
|-id=647 bgcolor=#E9E9E9
| 460647 ||  || — || November 23, 2006 || Mount Lemmon || Mount Lemmon Survey || — || align=right | 1.7 km || 
|-id=648 bgcolor=#E9E9E9
| 460648 ||  || — || October 31, 2010 || Kitt Peak || Spacewatch || — || align=right | 1.1 km || 
|-id=649 bgcolor=#E9E9E9
| 460649 ||  || — || November 1, 2005 || Kitt Peak || Spacewatch || — || align=right | 2.1 km || 
|-id=650 bgcolor=#E9E9E9
| 460650 ||  || — || November 4, 2005 || Catalina || CSS || — || align=right | 2.7 km || 
|-id=651 bgcolor=#d6d6d6
| 460651 ||  || — || October 25, 2003 || Kitt Peak || Spacewatch || — || align=right | 3.4 km || 
|-id=652 bgcolor=#E9E9E9
| 460652 ||  || — || August 16, 2009 || Kitt Peak || Spacewatch || — || align=right | 1.4 km || 
|-id=653 bgcolor=#E9E9E9
| 460653 ||  || — || September 14, 2005 || Kitt Peak || Spacewatch ||  || align=right | 1.7 km || 
|-id=654 bgcolor=#d6d6d6
| 460654 ||  || — || September 19, 2003 || Kitt Peak || Spacewatch || — || align=right | 2.4 km || 
|-id=655 bgcolor=#d6d6d6
| 460655 ||  || — || October 27, 2009 || Mount Lemmon || Mount Lemmon Survey || — || align=right | 2.6 km || 
|-id=656 bgcolor=#fefefe
| 460656 ||  || — || November 24, 2011 || Mount Lemmon || Mount Lemmon Survey || — || align=right data-sort-value="0.80" | 800 m || 
|-id=657 bgcolor=#E9E9E9
| 460657 ||  || — || March 11, 2007 || Kitt Peak || Spacewatch || — || align=right | 2.0 km || 
|-id=658 bgcolor=#d6d6d6
| 460658 ||  || — || November 10, 2009 || Kitt Peak || Spacewatch || EOS || align=right | 1.4 km || 
|-id=659 bgcolor=#d6d6d6
| 460659 ||  || — || April 2, 2006 || Kitt Peak || Spacewatch || — || align=right | 2.9 km || 
|-id=660 bgcolor=#E9E9E9
| 460660 ||  || — || March 10, 2007 || Mount Lemmon || Mount Lemmon Survey || — || align=right | 1.8 km || 
|-id=661 bgcolor=#E9E9E9
| 460661 ||  || — || July 5, 2005 || Mount Lemmon || Mount Lemmon Survey || (5) || align=right data-sort-value="0.92" | 920 m || 
|-id=662 bgcolor=#E9E9E9
| 460662 ||  || — || October 11, 2009 || Mount Lemmon || Mount Lemmon Survey || — || align=right | 2.2 km || 
|-id=663 bgcolor=#E9E9E9
| 460663 ||  || — || October 10, 2010 || Mount Lemmon || Mount Lemmon Survey || EUN || align=right | 1.1 km || 
|-id=664 bgcolor=#d6d6d6
| 460664 ||  || — || September 25, 2008 || Kitt Peak || Spacewatch || — || align=right | 2.6 km || 
|-id=665 bgcolor=#d6d6d6
| 460665 ||  || — || November 9, 2009 || Kitt Peak || Spacewatch || EOS || align=right | 1.8 km || 
|-id=666 bgcolor=#E9E9E9
| 460666 ||  || — || December 1, 2010 || Mount Lemmon || Mount Lemmon Survey || — || align=right | 1.1 km || 
|-id=667 bgcolor=#d6d6d6
| 460667 ||  || — || December 1, 2003 || Kitt Peak || Spacewatch || — || align=right | 3.4 km || 
|-id=668 bgcolor=#E9E9E9
| 460668 ||  || — || November 3, 2005 || Kitt Peak || Spacewatch || — || align=right | 2.3 km || 
|-id=669 bgcolor=#E9E9E9
| 460669 ||  || — || October 28, 2005 || Mount Lemmon || Mount Lemmon Survey || — || align=right | 1.9 km || 
|-id=670 bgcolor=#d6d6d6
| 460670 ||  || — || January 2, 2006 || Mount Lemmon || Mount Lemmon Survey || — || align=right | 2.6 km || 
|-id=671 bgcolor=#E9E9E9
| 460671 ||  || — || December 5, 2005 || Mount Lemmon || Mount Lemmon Survey || AGN || align=right | 1.1 km || 
|-id=672 bgcolor=#E9E9E9
| 460672 ||  || — || December 7, 2005 || Kitt Peak || Spacewatch || — || align=right | 2.2 km || 
|-id=673 bgcolor=#d6d6d6
| 460673 ||  || — || October 1, 2003 || Anderson Mesa || LONEOS || — || align=right | 3.9 km || 
|-id=674 bgcolor=#d6d6d6
| 460674 ||  || — || October 31, 2008 || Mount Lemmon || Mount Lemmon Survey || THB || align=right | 3.6 km || 
|-id=675 bgcolor=#E9E9E9
| 460675 ||  || — || July 10, 2005 || Kitt Peak || Spacewatch || BRG || align=right | 1.7 km || 
|-id=676 bgcolor=#d6d6d6
| 460676 ||  || — || November 30, 2005 || Kitt Peak || Spacewatch || 615 || align=right | 1.8 km || 
|-id=677 bgcolor=#d6d6d6
| 460677 ||  || — || May 16, 2012 || Kitt Peak || Spacewatch || — || align=right | 3.4 km || 
|-id=678 bgcolor=#E9E9E9
| 460678 ||  || — || September 21, 2009 || Catalina || CSS || GEF || align=right | 1.5 km || 
|-id=679 bgcolor=#d6d6d6
| 460679 ||  || — || March 20, 2010 || WISE || WISE || VER || align=right | 3.2 km || 
|-id=680 bgcolor=#d6d6d6
| 460680 ||  || — || January 12, 2011 || Mount Lemmon || Mount Lemmon Survey || — || align=right | 2.1 km || 
|-id=681 bgcolor=#d6d6d6
| 460681 ||  || — || April 30, 2006 || Anderson Mesa || LONEOS || — || align=right | 3.4 km || 
|-id=682 bgcolor=#E9E9E9
| 460682 ||  || — || October 4, 2006 || Mount Lemmon || Mount Lemmon Survey || — || align=right | 1.2 km || 
|-id=683 bgcolor=#fefefe
| 460683 ||  || — || January 31, 2009 || Mount Lemmon || Mount Lemmon Survey || — || align=right | 1.0 km || 
|-id=684 bgcolor=#d6d6d6
| 460684 ||  || — || May 4, 2006 || Kitt Peak || Spacewatch || — || align=right | 3.2 km || 
|-id=685 bgcolor=#fefefe
| 460685 ||  || — || October 21, 2007 || Kitt Peak || Spacewatch || — || align=right data-sort-value="0.87" | 870 m || 
|-id=686 bgcolor=#d6d6d6
| 460686 ||  || — || September 11, 2004 || Kitt Peak || Spacewatch || KOR || align=right | 1.3 km || 
|-id=687 bgcolor=#fefefe
| 460687 ||  || — || November 19, 2007 || Kitt Peak || Spacewatch || NYS || align=right data-sort-value="0.67" | 670 m || 
|-id=688 bgcolor=#d6d6d6
| 460688 ||  || — || October 1, 2003 || Kitt Peak || Spacewatch || EOS || align=right | 2.0 km || 
|-id=689 bgcolor=#d6d6d6
| 460689 ||  || — || September 24, 2008 || Kitt Peak || Spacewatch || — || align=right | 3.2 km || 
|-id=690 bgcolor=#d6d6d6
| 460690 ||  || — || October 24, 2004 || Kitt Peak || Spacewatch || KOR || align=right | 1.2 km || 
|-id=691 bgcolor=#E9E9E9
| 460691 ||  || — || September 20, 2001 || Socorro || LINEAR || — || align=right | 1.3 km || 
|-id=692 bgcolor=#E9E9E9
| 460692 ||  || — || March 30, 2008 || Kitt Peak || Spacewatch || — || align=right | 2.2 km || 
|-id=693 bgcolor=#E9E9E9
| 460693 ||  || — || October 31, 2010 || Kitt Peak || Spacewatch || — || align=right | 1.5 km || 
|-id=694 bgcolor=#E9E9E9
| 460694 ||  || — || August 18, 2009 || Kitt Peak || Spacewatch || — || align=right | 2.6 km || 
|-id=695 bgcolor=#E9E9E9
| 460695 ||  || — || November 2, 2010 || Kitt Peak || Spacewatch || — || align=right | 1.5 km || 
|-id=696 bgcolor=#d6d6d6
| 460696 ||  || — || December 2, 2005 || Kitt Peak || Spacewatch || BRA || align=right | 2.1 km || 
|-id=697 bgcolor=#d6d6d6
| 460697 ||  || — || November 16, 2009 || Mount Lemmon || Mount Lemmon Survey || — || align=right | 2.0 km || 
|-id=698 bgcolor=#d6d6d6
| 460698 ||  || — || December 10, 2004 || Kitt Peak || Spacewatch || — || align=right | 2.4 km || 
|-id=699 bgcolor=#d6d6d6
| 460699 ||  || — || March 2, 2010 || WISE || WISE || — || align=right | 3.9 km || 
|-id=700 bgcolor=#d6d6d6
| 460700 ||  || — || October 25, 2008 || Catalina || CSS || — || align=right | 3.1 km || 
|}

460701–460800 

|-bgcolor=#d6d6d6
| 460701 ||  || — || December 20, 2004 || Mount Lemmon || Mount Lemmon Survey || — || align=right | 2.9 km || 
|-id=702 bgcolor=#d6d6d6
| 460702 ||  || — || December 2, 2008 || Mount Lemmon || Mount Lemmon Survey || 7:4 || align=right | 3.1 km || 
|-id=703 bgcolor=#d6d6d6
| 460703 ||  || — || January 16, 2005 || Kitt Peak || Spacewatch || — || align=right | 3.9 km || 
|-id=704 bgcolor=#d6d6d6
| 460704 ||  || — || January 8, 2011 || Mount Lemmon || Mount Lemmon Survey || — || align=right | 3.7 km || 
|-id=705 bgcolor=#d6d6d6
| 460705 ||  || — || May 21, 2006 || Kitt Peak || Spacewatch || — || align=right | 4.9 km || 
|-id=706 bgcolor=#E9E9E9
| 460706 ||  || — || December 14, 2010 || Mount Lemmon || Mount Lemmon Survey || — || align=right | 1.8 km || 
|-id=707 bgcolor=#d6d6d6
| 460707 ||  || — || September 11, 2004 || Kitt Peak || Spacewatch || BRA || align=right | 1.6 km || 
|-id=708 bgcolor=#E9E9E9
| 460708 ||  || — || October 14, 2001 || Socorro || LINEAR || — || align=right | 1.7 km || 
|-id=709 bgcolor=#d6d6d6
| 460709 ||  || — || September 28, 2008 || Catalina || CSS || — || align=right | 4.0 km || 
|-id=710 bgcolor=#E9E9E9
| 460710 ||  || — || September 19, 2001 || Socorro || LINEAR || — || align=right | 1.6 km || 
|-id=711 bgcolor=#E9E9E9
| 460711 ||  || — || September 10, 2010 || Kitt Peak || Spacewatch || — || align=right | 1.6 km || 
|-id=712 bgcolor=#d6d6d6
| 460712 ||  || — || November 10, 2004 || Kitt Peak || Spacewatch || EOS || align=right | 2.3 km || 
|-id=713 bgcolor=#E9E9E9
| 460713 ||  || — || July 30, 2005 || Siding Spring || SSS || — || align=right | 2.3 km || 
|-id=714 bgcolor=#E9E9E9
| 460714 ||  || — || October 1, 2005 || Catalina || CSS || — || align=right | 2.5 km || 
|-id=715 bgcolor=#fefefe
| 460715 ||  || — || December 19, 2007 || Mount Lemmon || Mount Lemmon Survey || — || align=right | 1.0 km || 
|-id=716 bgcolor=#E9E9E9
| 460716 ||  || — || November 11, 2001 || Socorro || LINEAR || EUN || align=right | 1.4 km || 
|-id=717 bgcolor=#d6d6d6
| 460717 ||  || — || February 2, 2010 || WISE || WISE || — || align=right | 2.5 km || 
|-id=718 bgcolor=#E9E9E9
| 460718 ||  || — || October 30, 2010 || Mount Lemmon || Mount Lemmon Survey || — || align=right | 1.8 km || 
|-id=719 bgcolor=#d6d6d6
| 460719 ||  || — || September 28, 2008 || Catalina || CSS || — || align=right | 3.4 km || 
|-id=720 bgcolor=#fefefe
| 460720 ||  || — || September 14, 2007 || Catalina || CSS || (2076) || align=right data-sort-value="0.78" | 780 m || 
|-id=721 bgcolor=#fefefe
| 460721 ||  || — || December 19, 2004 || Mount Lemmon || Mount Lemmon Survey || — || align=right | 1.0 km || 
|-id=722 bgcolor=#E9E9E9
| 460722 ||  || — || November 26, 2005 || Kitt Peak || Spacewatch || WIT || align=right | 1.0 km || 
|-id=723 bgcolor=#E9E9E9
| 460723 ||  || — || October 30, 2005 || Mount Lemmon || Mount Lemmon Survey || — || align=right | 1.9 km || 
|-id=724 bgcolor=#d6d6d6
| 460724 ||  || — || December 18, 2004 || Mount Lemmon || Mount Lemmon Survey || — || align=right | 2.6 km || 
|-id=725 bgcolor=#E9E9E9
| 460725 ||  || — || May 31, 2013 || Kitt Peak || Spacewatch || EUN || align=right | 1.3 km || 
|-id=726 bgcolor=#fefefe
| 460726 ||  || — || September 15, 2007 || Mount Lemmon || Mount Lemmon Survey || V || align=right data-sort-value="0.80" | 800 m || 
|-id=727 bgcolor=#fefefe
| 460727 ||  || — || September 3, 2010 || Mount Lemmon || Mount Lemmon Survey || — || align=right | 1.1 km || 
|-id=728 bgcolor=#fefefe
| 460728 ||  || — || March 8, 2005 || Mount Lemmon || Mount Lemmon Survey || MAS || align=right data-sort-value="0.90" | 900 m || 
|-id=729 bgcolor=#d6d6d6
| 460729 ||  || — || December 18, 2009 || Catalina || CSS || Tj (2.98) || align=right | 3.9 km || 
|-id=730 bgcolor=#d6d6d6
| 460730 ||  || — || April 12, 2010 || WISE || WISE || Tj (2.97) || align=right | 3.6 km || 
|-id=731 bgcolor=#d6d6d6
| 460731 ||  || — || October 23, 2009 || Mount Lemmon || Mount Lemmon Survey || KOR || align=right | 1.5 km || 
|-id=732 bgcolor=#fefefe
| 460732 ||  || — || November 3, 2007 || Mount Lemmon || Mount Lemmon Survey || V || align=right data-sort-value="0.74" | 740 m || 
|-id=733 bgcolor=#E9E9E9
| 460733 ||  || — || September 12, 2009 || Kitt Peak || Spacewatch || — || align=right | 2.0 km || 
|-id=734 bgcolor=#d6d6d6
| 460734 ||  || — || October 12, 2009 || Mount Lemmon || Mount Lemmon Survey || TEL || align=right | 1.3 km || 
|-id=735 bgcolor=#d6d6d6
| 460735 ||  || — || November 20, 2003 || Kitt Peak || Spacewatch || — || align=right | 3.6 km || 
|-id=736 bgcolor=#d6d6d6
| 460736 ||  || — || March 13, 2010 || WISE || WISE || — || align=right | 2.6 km || 
|-id=737 bgcolor=#E9E9E9
| 460737 ||  || — || October 24, 2005 || Kitt Peak || Spacewatch || — || align=right | 2.3 km || 
|-id=738 bgcolor=#E9E9E9
| 460738 ||  || — || October 24, 2005 || Kitt Peak || Spacewatch || AGN || align=right | 1.2 km || 
|-id=739 bgcolor=#d6d6d6
| 460739 ||  || — || November 20, 2003 || Socorro || LINEAR || HYG || align=right | 2.4 km || 
|-id=740 bgcolor=#E9E9E9
| 460740 ||  || — || November 13, 2006 || Catalina || CSS || — || align=right | 1.0 km || 
|-id=741 bgcolor=#d6d6d6
| 460741 ||  || — || September 4, 2008 || Kitt Peak || Spacewatch || — || align=right | 2.3 km || 
|-id=742 bgcolor=#d6d6d6
| 460742 ||  || — || September 19, 2003 || Kitt Peak || Spacewatch || — || align=right | 2.1 km || 
|-id=743 bgcolor=#d6d6d6
| 460743 ||  || — || April 24, 2006 || Kitt Peak || Spacewatch || EOS || align=right | 2.1 km || 
|-id=744 bgcolor=#d6d6d6
| 460744 ||  || — || March 9, 2005 || Catalina || CSS || — || align=right | 4.9 km || 
|-id=745 bgcolor=#E9E9E9
| 460745 ||  || — || March 13, 2007 || Mount Lemmon || Mount Lemmon Survey || — || align=right | 2.2 km || 
|-id=746 bgcolor=#d6d6d6
| 460746 ||  || — || September 29, 2008 || Mount Lemmon || Mount Lemmon Survey || — || align=right | 2.7 km || 
|-id=747 bgcolor=#d6d6d6
| 460747 ||  || — || November 29, 2003 || Kitt Peak || Spacewatch || — || align=right | 3.7 km || 
|-id=748 bgcolor=#d6d6d6
| 460748 ||  || — || December 14, 2003 || Kitt Peak || Spacewatch || — || align=right | 3.9 km || 
|-id=749 bgcolor=#d6d6d6
| 460749 ||  || — || November 24, 2003 || Anderson Mesa || LONEOS || — || align=right | 3.0 km || 
|-id=750 bgcolor=#E9E9E9
| 460750 ||  || — || September 30, 2009 || Mount Lemmon || Mount Lemmon Survey || — || align=right | 2.5 km || 
|-id=751 bgcolor=#E9E9E9
| 460751 ||  || — || November 26, 2005 || Mount Lemmon || Mount Lemmon Survey || MRX || align=right | 1.0 km || 
|-id=752 bgcolor=#E9E9E9
| 460752 ||  || — || December 6, 2005 || Kitt Peak || Spacewatch || — || align=right | 2.4 km || 
|-id=753 bgcolor=#d6d6d6
| 460753 ||  || — || December 20, 2004 || Mount Lemmon || Mount Lemmon Survey || EOS || align=right | 1.8 km || 
|-id=754 bgcolor=#d6d6d6
| 460754 ||  || — || September 28, 2008 || Mount Lemmon || Mount Lemmon Survey || — || align=right | 2.7 km || 
|-id=755 bgcolor=#d6d6d6
| 460755 ||  || — || September 22, 2008 || Catalina || CSS || — || align=right | 3.3 km || 
|-id=756 bgcolor=#d6d6d6
| 460756 ||  || — || November 9, 2009 || Kitt Peak || Spacewatch || — || align=right | 2.3 km || 
|-id=757 bgcolor=#d6d6d6
| 460757 ||  || — || October 8, 2004 || Kitt Peak || Spacewatch || KOR || align=right | 1.3 km || 
|-id=758 bgcolor=#d6d6d6
| 460758 ||  || — || October 18, 2009 || Mount Lemmon || Mount Lemmon Survey || KOR || align=right | 1.5 km || 
|-id=759 bgcolor=#d6d6d6
| 460759 ||  || — || October 12, 2009 || Mount Lemmon || Mount Lemmon Survey ||  || align=right | 2.0 km || 
|-id=760 bgcolor=#E9E9E9
| 460760 ||  || — || October 23, 2006 || Mount Lemmon || Mount Lemmon Survey || — || align=right | 1.0 km || 
|-id=761 bgcolor=#d6d6d6
| 460761 ||  || — || December 3, 2008 || Kitt Peak || Spacewatch || — || align=right | 3.5 km || 
|-id=762 bgcolor=#E9E9E9
| 460762 ||  || — || December 17, 2001 || Socorro || LINEAR || — || align=right | 1.9 km || 
|-id=763 bgcolor=#d6d6d6
| 460763 ||  || — || November 19, 2009 || Kitt Peak || Spacewatch || — || align=right | 2.2 km || 
|-id=764 bgcolor=#d6d6d6
| 460764 ||  || — || October 29, 2008 || Mount Lemmon || Mount Lemmon Survey || — || align=right | 3.0 km || 
|-id=765 bgcolor=#d6d6d6
| 460765 ||  || — || November 17, 2009 || Kitt Peak || Spacewatch || EOS || align=right | 1.7 km || 
|-id=766 bgcolor=#d6d6d6
| 460766 ||  || — || April 1, 2011 || Mount Lemmon || Mount Lemmon Survey || — || align=right | 2.5 km || 
|-id=767 bgcolor=#d6d6d6
| 460767 ||  || — || May 29, 2012 || Mount Lemmon || Mount Lemmon Survey || EOS || align=right | 2.2 km || 
|-id=768 bgcolor=#d6d6d6
| 460768 ||  || — || September 20, 2008 || Catalina || CSS || — || align=right | 2.9 km || 
|-id=769 bgcolor=#d6d6d6
| 460769 ||  || — || November 18, 2009 || Kitt Peak || Spacewatch || — || align=right | 2.8 km || 
|-id=770 bgcolor=#d6d6d6
| 460770 ||  || — || April 16, 2010 || WISE || WISE || VER || align=right | 4.0 km || 
|-id=771 bgcolor=#d6d6d6
| 460771 ||  || — || September 21, 2009 || Kitt Peak || Spacewatch || — || align=right | 3.9 km || 
|-id=772 bgcolor=#E9E9E9
| 460772 ||  || — || March 28, 2008 || Kitt Peak || Spacewatch || — || align=right | 2.0 km || 
|-id=773 bgcolor=#d6d6d6
| 460773 ||  || — || July 29, 2008 || Kitt Peak || Spacewatch || — || align=right | 2.4 km || 
|-id=774 bgcolor=#d6d6d6
| 460774 ||  || — || October 17, 2003 || Kitt Peak || Spacewatch || — || align=right | 2.8 km || 
|-id=775 bgcolor=#d6d6d6
| 460775 ||  || — || April 1, 2012 || Mount Lemmon || Mount Lemmon Survey || — || align=right | 2.4 km || 
|-id=776 bgcolor=#d6d6d6
| 460776 ||  || — || September 20, 2008 || Kitt Peak || Spacewatch || — || align=right | 2.9 km || 
|-id=777 bgcolor=#d6d6d6
| 460777 ||  || — || December 14, 2010 || Mount Lemmon || Mount Lemmon Survey || — || align=right | 3.0 km || 
|-id=778 bgcolor=#d6d6d6
| 460778 ||  || — || April 7, 2006 || Kitt Peak || Spacewatch || — || align=right | 2.7 km || 
|-id=779 bgcolor=#E9E9E9
| 460779 ||  || — || October 26, 2009 || Mount Lemmon || Mount Lemmon Survey || — || align=right | 2.9 km || 
|-id=780 bgcolor=#d6d6d6
| 460780 ||  || — || April 18, 2010 || WISE || WISE || — || align=right | 3.6 km || 
|-id=781 bgcolor=#E9E9E9
| 460781 ||  || — || April 18, 2012 || Kitt Peak || Spacewatch || — || align=right | 2.0 km || 
|-id=782 bgcolor=#d6d6d6
| 460782 ||  || — || November 18, 2003 || Kitt Peak || Spacewatch || TIR || align=right | 2.2 km || 
|-id=783 bgcolor=#d6d6d6
| 460783 ||  || — || October 18, 2003 || Kitt Peak || Spacewatch || EOS || align=right | 1.8 km || 
|-id=784 bgcolor=#d6d6d6
| 460784 ||  || — || October 10, 2008 || Mount Lemmon || Mount Lemmon Survey || — || align=right | 2.8 km || 
|-id=785 bgcolor=#E9E9E9
| 460785 ||  || — || January 7, 2011 || Kitt Peak || Spacewatch || AST || align=right | 1.7 km || 
|-id=786 bgcolor=#C2FFFF
| 460786 ||  || — || October 4, 2013 || Mount Lemmon || Mount Lemmon Survey || L5 || align=right | 8.3 km || 
|-id=787 bgcolor=#E9E9E9
| 460787 ||  || — || October 1, 2005 || Kitt Peak || Spacewatch || — || align=right | 1.4 km || 
|-id=788 bgcolor=#fefefe
| 460788 ||  || — || October 3, 2010 || Catalina || CSS || — || align=right | 1.1 km || 
|-id=789 bgcolor=#fefefe
| 460789 ||  || — || September 27, 2003 || Kitt Peak || Spacewatch || — || align=right data-sort-value="0.87" | 870 m || 
|-id=790 bgcolor=#C2FFFF
| 460790 ||  || — || June 24, 2011 || Mount Lemmon || Mount Lemmon Survey || L5 || align=right | 9.5 km || 
|-id=791 bgcolor=#d6d6d6
| 460791 ||  || — || September 28, 2008 || Mount Lemmon || Mount Lemmon Survey || — || align=right | 3.0 km || 
|-id=792 bgcolor=#d6d6d6
| 460792 ||  || — || February 2, 2006 || Mount Lemmon || Mount Lemmon Survey || — || align=right | 2.4 km || 
|-id=793 bgcolor=#E9E9E9
| 460793 ||  || — || September 14, 2005 || Kitt Peak || Spacewatch || — || align=right | 1.5 km || 
|-id=794 bgcolor=#E9E9E9
| 460794 ||  || — || December 14, 2001 || Kitt Peak || Spacewatch || — || align=right | 1.7 km || 
|-id=795 bgcolor=#E9E9E9
| 460795 ||  || — || March 8, 2008 || Mount Lemmon || Mount Lemmon Survey || — || align=right data-sort-value="0.84" | 840 m || 
|-id=796 bgcolor=#fefefe
| 460796 ||  || — || January 30, 2006 || Kitt Peak || Spacewatch || — || align=right data-sort-value="0.81" | 810 m || 
|-id=797 bgcolor=#E9E9E9
| 460797 ||  || — || December 4, 2005 || Kitt Peak || Spacewatch || HOF || align=right | 2.6 km || 
|-id=798 bgcolor=#d6d6d6
| 460798 ||  || — || October 8, 2008 || Mount Lemmon || Mount Lemmon Survey || — || align=right | 3.1 km || 
|-id=799 bgcolor=#d6d6d6
| 460799 ||  || — || February 9, 2005 || Kitt Peak || Spacewatch || — || align=right | 2.9 km || 
|-id=800 bgcolor=#d6d6d6
| 460800 ||  || — || September 23, 2008 || Kitt Peak || Spacewatch || — || align=right | 2.9 km || 
|}

460801–460900 

|-bgcolor=#d6d6d6
| 460801 ||  || — || March 16, 2007 || Kitt Peak || Spacewatch || 615 || align=right | 1.4 km || 
|-id=802 bgcolor=#d6d6d6
| 460802 ||  || — || October 28, 2008 || Mount Lemmon || Mount Lemmon Survey || — || align=right | 3.1 km || 
|-id=803 bgcolor=#E9E9E9
| 460803 ||  || — || March 28, 2008 || Mount Lemmon || Mount Lemmon Survey || — || align=right data-sort-value="0.92" | 920 m || 
|-id=804 bgcolor=#E9E9E9
| 460804 ||  || — || September 26, 1995 || Kitt Peak || Spacewatch || — || align=right | 2.1 km || 
|-id=805 bgcolor=#d6d6d6
| 460805 ||  || — || January 22, 2006 || Mount Lemmon || Mount Lemmon Survey || — || align=right | 2.1 km || 
|-id=806 bgcolor=#d6d6d6
| 460806 ||  || — || December 18, 2003 || Kitt Peak || Spacewatch || LIX || align=right | 3.7 km || 
|-id=807 bgcolor=#d6d6d6
| 460807 ||  || — || May 10, 2007 || Mount Lemmon || Mount Lemmon Survey || — || align=right | 2.8 km || 
|-id=808 bgcolor=#E9E9E9
| 460808 ||  || — || August 25, 2004 || Kitt Peak || Spacewatch || — || align=right | 2.2 km || 
|-id=809 bgcolor=#d6d6d6
| 460809 ||  || — || February 2, 2006 || Kitt Peak || Spacewatch || — || align=right | 2.4 km || 
|-id=810 bgcolor=#E9E9E9
| 460810 ||  || — || September 18, 2009 || Kitt Peak || Spacewatch || — || align=right | 2.0 km || 
|-id=811 bgcolor=#E9E9E9
| 460811 ||  || — || December 13, 2006 || Kitt Peak || Spacewatch || — || align=right data-sort-value="0.95" | 950 m || 
|-id=812 bgcolor=#d6d6d6
| 460812 ||  || — || January 26, 2001 || Kitt Peak || Spacewatch || KOR || align=right | 1.8 km || 
|-id=813 bgcolor=#d6d6d6
| 460813 ||  || — || October 21, 2003 || Kitt Peak || Spacewatch || — || align=right | 2.3 km || 
|-id=814 bgcolor=#E9E9E9
| 460814 ||  || — || February 6, 2002 || Kitt Peak || Spacewatch || AST || align=right | 1.6 km || 
|-id=815 bgcolor=#d6d6d6
| 460815 ||  || — || March 28, 2011 || Mount Lemmon || Mount Lemmon Survey || — || align=right | 2.5 km || 
|-id=816 bgcolor=#d6d6d6
| 460816 ||  || — || March 13, 2005 || Kitt Peak || Spacewatch || — || align=right | 2.7 km || 
|-id=817 bgcolor=#d6d6d6
| 460817 ||  || — || March 16, 2005 || Mount Lemmon || Mount Lemmon Survey || THM || align=right | 2.3 km || 
|-id=818 bgcolor=#d6d6d6
| 460818 ||  || — || November 18, 2008 || Kitt Peak || Spacewatch || — || align=right | 3.9 km || 
|-id=819 bgcolor=#E9E9E9
| 460819 ||  || — || October 1, 2000 || Socorro || LINEAR || AEO || align=right | 1.2 km || 
|-id=820 bgcolor=#E9E9E9
| 460820 ||  || — || September 15, 2009 || Kitt Peak || Spacewatch || HOF || align=right | 3.0 km || 
|-id=821 bgcolor=#d6d6d6
| 460821 ||  || — || September 6, 2008 || Mount Lemmon || Mount Lemmon Survey || — || align=right | 2.2 km || 
|-id=822 bgcolor=#fefefe
| 460822 ||  || — || October 12, 2007 || Mount Lemmon || Mount Lemmon Survey || — || align=right data-sort-value="0.96" | 960 m || 
|-id=823 bgcolor=#d6d6d6
| 460823 ||  || — || September 30, 2009 || Mount Lemmon || Mount Lemmon Survey || — || align=right | 2.8 km || 
|-id=824 bgcolor=#E9E9E9
| 460824 ||  || — || September 25, 2009 || Mount Lemmon || Mount Lemmon Survey || HOF || align=right | 2.6 km || 
|-id=825 bgcolor=#E9E9E9
| 460825 ||  || — || September 11, 2005 || Kitt Peak || Spacewatch || — || align=right | 1.5 km || 
|-id=826 bgcolor=#E9E9E9
| 460826 ||  || — || September 19, 2009 || Kitt Peak || Spacewatch || — || align=right | 1.8 km || 
|-id=827 bgcolor=#E9E9E9
| 460827 ||  || — || March 29, 2008 || Catalina || CSS || — || align=right | 1.2 km || 
|-id=828 bgcolor=#d6d6d6
| 460828 ||  || — || October 28, 1997 || Kitt Peak || Spacewatch || THM || align=right | 1.6 km || 
|-id=829 bgcolor=#E9E9E9
| 460829 ||  || — || October 14, 2010 || Mount Lemmon || Mount Lemmon Survey || — || align=right data-sort-value="0.90" | 900 m || 
|-id=830 bgcolor=#E9E9E9
| 460830 ||  || — || March 21, 2012 || Mount Lemmon || Mount Lemmon Survey || — || align=right | 1.8 km || 
|-id=831 bgcolor=#E9E9E9
| 460831 ||  || — || April 6, 2008 || Mount Lemmon || Mount Lemmon Survey || — || align=right data-sort-value="0.98" | 980 m || 
|-id=832 bgcolor=#E9E9E9
| 460832 ||  || — || October 27, 2005 || Kitt Peak || Spacewatch || — || align=right | 1.7 km || 
|-id=833 bgcolor=#d6d6d6
| 460833 ||  || — || September 7, 2008 || Mount Lemmon || Mount Lemmon Survey || — || align=right | 2.0 km || 
|-id=834 bgcolor=#d6d6d6
| 460834 ||  || — || September 3, 1999 || Kitt Peak || Spacewatch || — || align=right | 2.2 km || 
|-id=835 bgcolor=#d6d6d6
| 460835 ||  || — || October 18, 2009 || Mount Lemmon || Mount Lemmon Survey || EOS || align=right | 1.4 km || 
|-id=836 bgcolor=#d6d6d6
| 460836 ||  || — || September 20, 2003 || Anderson Mesa || LONEOS || — || align=right | 3.4 km || 
|-id=837 bgcolor=#fefefe
| 460837 ||  || — || January 2, 2012 || Kitt Peak || Spacewatch || — || align=right data-sort-value="0.89" | 890 m || 
|-id=838 bgcolor=#d6d6d6
| 460838 ||  || — || November 21, 2009 || Kitt Peak || Spacewatch || — || align=right | 2.6 km || 
|-id=839 bgcolor=#d6d6d6
| 460839 ||  || — || November 10, 2009 || Kitt Peak || Spacewatch || EOS || align=right | 1.6 km || 
|-id=840 bgcolor=#fefefe
| 460840 ||  || — || March 31, 2009 || Kitt Peak || Spacewatch || NYS || align=right data-sort-value="0.67" | 670 m || 
|-id=841 bgcolor=#d6d6d6
| 460841 ||  || — || November 2, 2008 || Kitt Peak || Spacewatch || — || align=right | 2.5 km || 
|-id=842 bgcolor=#d6d6d6
| 460842 ||  || — || December 24, 2005 || Kitt Peak || Spacewatch || — || align=right | 2.4 km || 
|-id=843 bgcolor=#d6d6d6
| 460843 ||  || — || November 5, 1999 || Kitt Peak || Spacewatch || — || align=right | 2.2 km || 
|-id=844 bgcolor=#d6d6d6
| 460844 ||  || — || October 26, 2009 || Kitt Peak || Spacewatch || KOR || align=right | 1.4 km || 
|-id=845 bgcolor=#d6d6d6
| 460845 ||  || — || October 27, 2008 || Kitt Peak || Spacewatch || — || align=right | 2.5 km || 
|-id=846 bgcolor=#fefefe
| 460846 ||  || — || April 11, 2003 || Kitt Peak || Spacewatch || — || align=right data-sort-value="0.69" | 690 m || 
|-id=847 bgcolor=#d6d6d6
| 460847 ||  || — || January 10, 2010 || Mount Lemmon || Mount Lemmon Survey || — || align=right | 3.7 km || 
|-id=848 bgcolor=#E9E9E9
| 460848 ||  || — || June 13, 2005 || Mount Lemmon || Mount Lemmon Survey || — || align=right data-sort-value="0.92" | 920 m || 
|-id=849 bgcolor=#d6d6d6
| 460849 ||  || — || November 19, 2009 || Kitt Peak || Spacewatch || — || align=right | 3.3 km || 
|-id=850 bgcolor=#d6d6d6
| 460850 ||  || — || May 13, 2012 || Mount Lemmon || Mount Lemmon Survey || — || align=right | 2.5 km || 
|-id=851 bgcolor=#d6d6d6
| 460851 ||  || — || July 29, 2008 || Mount Lemmon || Mount Lemmon Survey || — || align=right | 2.5 km || 
|-id=852 bgcolor=#E9E9E9
| 460852 ||  || — || October 1, 2005 || Kitt Peak || Spacewatch || — || align=right | 1.5 km || 
|-id=853 bgcolor=#E9E9E9
| 460853 ||  || — || March 30, 2008 || Kitt Peak || Spacewatch || — || align=right | 1.5 km || 
|-id=854 bgcolor=#d6d6d6
| 460854 ||  || — || November 24, 2009 || Kitt Peak || Spacewatch || EOS || align=right | 1.8 km || 
|-id=855 bgcolor=#E9E9E9
| 460855 ||  || — || September 17, 2009 || Mount Lemmon || Mount Lemmon Survey || — || align=right | 2.4 km || 
|-id=856 bgcolor=#E9E9E9
| 460856 ||  || — || April 20, 2012 || Mount Lemmon || Mount Lemmon Survey || PAD || align=right | 1.6 km || 
|-id=857 bgcolor=#d6d6d6
| 460857 ||  || — || April 30, 2006 || Kitt Peak || Spacewatch || — || align=right | 3.8 km || 
|-id=858 bgcolor=#E9E9E9
| 460858 ||  || — || October 23, 2006 || Catalina || CSS || EUN || align=right | 1.7 km || 
|-id=859 bgcolor=#d6d6d6
| 460859 ||  || — || May 1, 2006 || Kitt Peak || Spacewatch || — || align=right | 2.9 km || 
|-id=860 bgcolor=#fefefe
| 460860 ||  || — || September 16, 2003 || Kitt Peak || Spacewatch || — || align=right | 1.9 km || 
|-id=861 bgcolor=#d6d6d6
| 460861 ||  || — || September 16, 2003 || Kitt Peak || Spacewatch || EOS || align=right | 2.4 km || 
|-id=862 bgcolor=#fefefe
| 460862 ||  || — || August 21, 2006 || Kitt Peak || Spacewatch || — || align=right data-sort-value="0.72" | 720 m || 
|-id=863 bgcolor=#d6d6d6
| 460863 ||  || — || October 24, 2008 || Kitt Peak || Spacewatch || — || align=right | 3.4 km || 
|-id=864 bgcolor=#d6d6d6
| 460864 ||  || — || December 28, 2003 || Kitt Peak || Spacewatch || — || align=right | 2.6 km || 
|-id=865 bgcolor=#d6d6d6
| 460865 ||  || — || October 14, 2007 || Mount Lemmon || Mount Lemmon Survey || HYG || align=right | 3.6 km || 
|-id=866 bgcolor=#E9E9E9
| 460866 ||  || — || September 12, 2004 || Kitt Peak || Spacewatch || — || align=right | 2.1 km || 
|-id=867 bgcolor=#E9E9E9
| 460867 ||  || — || September 28, 2009 || Kitt Peak || Spacewatch || — || align=right | 2.3 km || 
|-id=868 bgcolor=#d6d6d6
| 460868 ||  || — || October 20, 2003 || Kitt Peak || Spacewatch || HYG || align=right | 2.5 km || 
|-id=869 bgcolor=#d6d6d6
| 460869 ||  || — || September 19, 2003 || Kitt Peak || Spacewatch || EOS || align=right | 1.5 km || 
|-id=870 bgcolor=#E9E9E9
| 460870 ||  || — || April 14, 2004 || Kitt Peak || Spacewatch || — || align=right data-sort-value="0.98" | 980 m || 
|-id=871 bgcolor=#d6d6d6
| 460871 ||  || — || September 24, 2008 || Mount Lemmon || Mount Lemmon Survey || EOS || align=right | 2.1 km || 
|-id=872 bgcolor=#d6d6d6
| 460872 ||  || — || September 24, 2008 || Kitt Peak || Spacewatch || THM || align=right | 2.0 km || 
|-id=873 bgcolor=#d6d6d6
| 460873 ||  || — || November 17, 2008 || Kitt Peak || Spacewatch || 7:4 || align=right | 3.8 km || 
|-id=874 bgcolor=#d6d6d6
| 460874 ||  || — || October 1, 2008 || Mount Lemmon || Mount Lemmon Survey || — || align=right | 2.7 km || 
|-id=875 bgcolor=#d6d6d6
| 460875 ||  || — || November 20, 2009 || Kitt Peak || Spacewatch || — || align=right | 2.1 km || 
|-id=876 bgcolor=#d6d6d6
| 460876 ||  || — || March 24, 2006 || Mount Lemmon || Mount Lemmon Survey || — || align=right | 3.1 km || 
|-id=877 bgcolor=#d6d6d6
| 460877 ||  || — || February 9, 2005 || Kitt Peak || Spacewatch || THM || align=right | 2.0 km || 
|-id=878 bgcolor=#d6d6d6
| 460878 ||  || — || June 11, 2012 || Mount Lemmon || Mount Lemmon Survey || — || align=right | 2.4 km || 
|-id=879 bgcolor=#d6d6d6
| 460879 ||  || — || November 30, 2003 || Kitt Peak || Spacewatch || — || align=right | 3.3 km || 
|-id=880 bgcolor=#E9E9E9
| 460880 ||  || — || August 20, 2009 || Kitt Peak || Spacewatch || — || align=right | 1.7 km || 
|-id=881 bgcolor=#d6d6d6
| 460881 ||  || — || October 21, 2009 || Mount Lemmon || Mount Lemmon Survey || — || align=right | 2.4 km || 
|-id=882 bgcolor=#d6d6d6
| 460882 ||  || — || September 18, 2009 || Mount Lemmon || Mount Lemmon Survey || — || align=right | 1.8 km || 
|-id=883 bgcolor=#E9E9E9
| 460883 ||  || — || October 28, 2005 || Mount Lemmon || Mount Lemmon Survey || — || align=right | 1.9 km || 
|-id=884 bgcolor=#d6d6d6
| 460884 ||  || — || November 11, 2009 || Mount Lemmon || Mount Lemmon Survey || — || align=right | 2.6 km || 
|-id=885 bgcolor=#E9E9E9
| 460885 ||  || — || February 21, 2007 || Mount Lemmon || Mount Lemmon Survey || HOF || align=right | 2.3 km || 
|-id=886 bgcolor=#d6d6d6
| 460886 ||  || — || December 9, 2004 || Kitt Peak || Spacewatch || — || align=right | 3.6 km || 
|-id=887 bgcolor=#d6d6d6
| 460887 ||  || — || April 24, 2007 || Kitt Peak || Spacewatch || — || align=right | 3.3 km || 
|-id=888 bgcolor=#E9E9E9
| 460888 ||  || — || September 1, 2005 || Kitt Peak || Spacewatch || — || align=right | 1.4 km || 
|-id=889 bgcolor=#fefefe
| 460889 ||  || — || February 20, 2009 || Mount Lemmon || Mount Lemmon Survey || — || align=right data-sort-value="0.79" | 790 m || 
|-id=890 bgcolor=#d6d6d6
| 460890 ||  || — || December 22, 2000 || Kitt Peak || Spacewatch || — || align=right | 2.4 km || 
|-id=891 bgcolor=#d6d6d6
| 460891 ||  || — || November 4, 2004 || Kitt Peak || Spacewatch || — || align=right | 2.6 km || 
|-id=892 bgcolor=#d6d6d6
| 460892 ||  || — || October 8, 2008 || Kitt Peak || Spacewatch || — || align=right | 2.5 km || 
|-id=893 bgcolor=#d6d6d6
| 460893 ||  || — || March 16, 2007 || Kitt Peak || Spacewatch || — || align=right | 2.8 km || 
|-id=894 bgcolor=#fefefe
| 460894 ||  || — || December 22, 2008 || Kitt Peak || Spacewatch || — || align=right data-sort-value="0.99" | 990 m || 
|-id=895 bgcolor=#d6d6d6
| 460895 ||  || — || November 9, 2009 || Mount Lemmon || Mount Lemmon Survey || — || align=right | 3.8 km || 
|-id=896 bgcolor=#d6d6d6
| 460896 ||  || — || November 9, 2009 || Kitt Peak || Spacewatch || — || align=right | 4.8 km || 
|-id=897 bgcolor=#E9E9E9
| 460897 ||  || — || January 27, 2007 || Mount Lemmon || Mount Lemmon Survey || — || align=right | 2.4 km || 
|-id=898 bgcolor=#E9E9E9
| 460898 ||  || — || December 18, 2001 || Kitt Peak || Spacewatch || WIT || align=right | 1.0 km || 
|-id=899 bgcolor=#E9E9E9
| 460899 ||  || — || October 19, 2006 || Mount Lemmon || Mount Lemmon Survey || — || align=right data-sort-value="0.98" | 980 m || 
|-id=900 bgcolor=#E9E9E9
| 460900 ||  || — || February 18, 2008 || Mount Lemmon || Mount Lemmon Survey || — || align=right | 1.0 km || 
|}

460901–461000 

|-bgcolor=#E9E9E9
| 460901 ||  || — || March 27, 2008 || Mount Lemmon || Mount Lemmon Survey || — || align=right | 2.5 km || 
|-id=902 bgcolor=#E9E9E9
| 460902 ||  || — || November 17, 2006 || Mount Lemmon || Mount Lemmon Survey || — || align=right | 1.6 km || 
|-id=903 bgcolor=#E9E9E9
| 460903 ||  || — || August 17, 2009 || Catalina || CSS || — || align=right | 1.9 km || 
|-id=904 bgcolor=#d6d6d6
| 460904 ||  || — || September 9, 2008 || Mount Lemmon || Mount Lemmon Survey || — || align=right | 2.3 km || 
|-id=905 bgcolor=#d6d6d6
| 460905 ||  || — || December 17, 2009 || Mount Lemmon || Mount Lemmon Survey || — || align=right | 4.0 km || 
|-id=906 bgcolor=#d6d6d6
| 460906 ||  || — || August 10, 2007 || Kitt Peak || Spacewatch || — || align=right | 3.2 km || 
|-id=907 bgcolor=#d6d6d6
| 460907 ||  || — || September 24, 2008 || Mount Lemmon || Mount Lemmon Survey || — || align=right | 2.8 km || 
|-id=908 bgcolor=#d6d6d6
| 460908 ||  || — || April 10, 2005 || Kitt Peak || Spacewatch || — || align=right | 3.6 km || 
|-id=909 bgcolor=#d6d6d6
| 460909 ||  || — || November 20, 2009 || Kitt Peak || Spacewatch || EOS || align=right | 2.2 km || 
|-id=910 bgcolor=#d6d6d6
| 460910 ||  || — || November 8, 2009 || Mount Lemmon || Mount Lemmon Survey || — || align=right | 2.2 km || 
|-id=911 bgcolor=#fefefe
| 460911 ||  || — || January 2, 2012 || Mount Lemmon || Mount Lemmon Survey || — || align=right | 1.1 km || 
|-id=912 bgcolor=#d6d6d6
| 460912 ||  || — || November 11, 2004 || Kitt Peak || Spacewatch || — || align=right | 5.1 km || 
|-id=913 bgcolor=#fefefe
| 460913 ||  || — || May 5, 2006 || Kitt Peak || Spacewatch || — || align=right data-sort-value="0.89" | 890 m || 
|-id=914 bgcolor=#E9E9E9
| 460914 ||  || — || November 16, 2006 || Mount Lemmon || Mount Lemmon Survey || — || align=right | 1.2 km || 
|-id=915 bgcolor=#d6d6d6
| 460915 ||  || — || November 26, 2009 || Mount Lemmon || Mount Lemmon Survey || — || align=right | 4.2 km || 
|-id=916 bgcolor=#d6d6d6
| 460916 ||  || — || April 28, 2012 || Mount Lemmon || Mount Lemmon Survey || — || align=right | 3.3 km || 
|-id=917 bgcolor=#E9E9E9
| 460917 ||  || — || December 2, 2005 || Kitt Peak || Spacewatch || HOF || align=right | 2.4 km || 
|-id=918 bgcolor=#d6d6d6
| 460918 ||  || — || November 16, 2009 || Kitt Peak || Spacewatch || — || align=right | 3.3 km || 
|-id=919 bgcolor=#E9E9E9
| 460919 ||  || — || October 23, 2005 || Catalina || CSS || — || align=right | 1.8 km || 
|-id=920 bgcolor=#E9E9E9
| 460920 ||  || — || October 30, 2005 || Kitt Peak || Spacewatch || PAD || align=right | 1.8 km || 
|-id=921 bgcolor=#d6d6d6
| 460921 ||  || — || November 10, 2009 || Kitt Peak || Spacewatch || — || align=right | 3.6 km || 
|-id=922 bgcolor=#d6d6d6
| 460922 ||  || — || October 24, 2009 || Kitt Peak || Spacewatch || KOR || align=right | 1.4 km || 
|-id=923 bgcolor=#d6d6d6
| 460923 ||  || — || September 5, 2003 || Campo Imperatore || CINEOS || — || align=right | 2.9 km || 
|-id=924 bgcolor=#d6d6d6
| 460924 ||  || — || October 9, 2008 || Kitt Peak || Spacewatch || — || align=right | 3.0 km || 
|-id=925 bgcolor=#d6d6d6
| 460925 ||  || — || November 17, 2009 || Kitt Peak || Spacewatch || — || align=right | 2.2 km || 
|-id=926 bgcolor=#d6d6d6
| 460926 ||  || — || October 31, 2008 || Mount Lemmon || Mount Lemmon Survey || — || align=right | 3.8 km || 
|-id=927 bgcolor=#d6d6d6
| 460927 ||  || — || January 29, 2011 || Kitt Peak || Spacewatch || — || align=right | 2.1 km || 
|-id=928 bgcolor=#d6d6d6
| 460928 ||  || — || October 20, 2003 || Kitt Peak || Spacewatch || EOS || align=right | 1.9 km || 
|-id=929 bgcolor=#d6d6d6
| 460929 ||  || — || November 26, 2003 || Kitt Peak || Spacewatch || — || align=right | 3.2 km || 
|-id=930 bgcolor=#E9E9E9
| 460930 ||  || — || March 8, 2008 || Mount Lemmon || Mount Lemmon Survey || (5) || align=right data-sort-value="0.95" | 950 m || 
|-id=931 bgcolor=#E9E9E9
| 460931 ||  || — || September 17, 2009 || Catalina || CSS || — || align=right | 2.8 km || 
|-id=932 bgcolor=#E9E9E9
| 460932 ||  || — || December 2, 2005 || Mount Lemmon || Mount Lemmon Survey || — || align=right | 2.0 km || 
|-id=933 bgcolor=#E9E9E9
| 460933 ||  || — || September 17, 2009 || Kitt Peak || Spacewatch || WIT || align=right | 1.2 km || 
|-id=934 bgcolor=#E9E9E9
| 460934 ||  || — || September 15, 2004 || Kitt Peak || Spacewatch || — || align=right | 2.2 km || 
|-id=935 bgcolor=#d6d6d6
| 460935 ||  || — || January 6, 2010 || Kitt Peak || Spacewatch || 7:4 || align=right | 3.0 km || 
|-id=936 bgcolor=#E9E9E9
| 460936 ||  || — || December 15, 2006 || Kitt Peak || Spacewatch || — || align=right | 1.5 km || 
|-id=937 bgcolor=#d6d6d6
| 460937 ||  || — || March 11, 2005 || Mount Lemmon || Mount Lemmon Survey || — || align=right | 2.5 km || 
|-id=938 bgcolor=#E9E9E9
| 460938 ||  || — || May 29, 2008 || Mount Lemmon || Mount Lemmon Survey || — || align=right | 2.5 km || 
|-id=939 bgcolor=#E9E9E9
| 460939 ||  || — || December 27, 2006 || Mount Lemmon || Mount Lemmon Survey || WIT || align=right | 1.0 km || 
|-id=940 bgcolor=#d6d6d6
| 460940 ||  || — || December 17, 2009 || Kitt Peak || Spacewatch || EOS || align=right | 1.9 km || 
|-id=941 bgcolor=#d6d6d6
| 460941 ||  || — || March 11, 2011 || Kitt Peak || Spacewatch || — || align=right | 2.6 km || 
|-id=942 bgcolor=#E9E9E9
| 460942 ||  || — || March 14, 2007 || Kitt Peak || Spacewatch || — || align=right | 2.4 km || 
|-id=943 bgcolor=#d6d6d6
| 460943 ||  || — || April 30, 2006 || Kitt Peak || Spacewatch || — || align=right | 2.4 km || 
|-id=944 bgcolor=#E9E9E9
| 460944 ||  || — || October 26, 2005 || Kitt Peak || Spacewatch || — || align=right | 2.2 km || 
|-id=945 bgcolor=#d6d6d6
| 460945 ||  || — || March 4, 2005 || Mount Lemmon || Mount Lemmon Survey || — || align=right | 3.1 km || 
|-id=946 bgcolor=#E9E9E9
| 460946 ||  || — || May 28, 2008 || Mount Lemmon || Mount Lemmon Survey || — || align=right | 1.5 km || 
|-id=947 bgcolor=#d6d6d6
| 460947 ||  || — || October 29, 2008 || Kitt Peak || Spacewatch || VER || align=right | 2.3 km || 
|-id=948 bgcolor=#d6d6d6
| 460948 ||  || — || April 5, 2011 || Kitt Peak || Spacewatch || — || align=right | 2.2 km || 
|-id=949 bgcolor=#E9E9E9
| 460949 ||  || — || September 11, 2004 || Kitt Peak || Spacewatch || — || align=right | 2.1 km || 
|-id=950 bgcolor=#d6d6d6
| 460950 ||  || — || October 20, 2007 || Kitt Peak || Spacewatch || SYL7:4 || align=right | 4.1 km || 
|-id=951 bgcolor=#E9E9E9
| 460951 ||  || — || October 25, 2005 || Kitt Peak || Spacewatch || — || align=right | 2.0 km || 
|-id=952 bgcolor=#d6d6d6
| 460952 ||  || — || April 1, 2010 || WISE || WISE || — || align=right | 4.3 km || 
|-id=953 bgcolor=#fefefe
| 460953 ||  || — || October 17, 2007 || Mount Lemmon || Mount Lemmon Survey || V || align=right data-sort-value="0.64" | 640 m || 
|-id=954 bgcolor=#E9E9E9
| 460954 ||  || — || December 21, 2005 || Kitt Peak || Spacewatch || — || align=right | 2.1 km || 
|-id=955 bgcolor=#d6d6d6
| 460955 ||  || — || December 18, 2009 || Mount Lemmon || Mount Lemmon Survey || — || align=right | 3.0 km || 
|-id=956 bgcolor=#d6d6d6
| 460956 ||  || — || May 19, 2012 || Mount Lemmon || Mount Lemmon Survey || — || align=right | 3.5 km || 
|-id=957 bgcolor=#d6d6d6
| 460957 ||  || — || November 27, 2009 || Kitt Peak || Spacewatch || EOS || align=right | 1.9 km || 
|-id=958 bgcolor=#d6d6d6
| 460958 ||  || — || March 24, 2006 || Mount Lemmon || Mount Lemmon Survey || — || align=right | 3.2 km || 
|-id=959 bgcolor=#d6d6d6
| 460959 ||  || — || April 18, 2010 || WISE || WISE || — || align=right | 4.5 km || 
|-id=960 bgcolor=#d6d6d6
| 460960 ||  || — || March 17, 2010 || WISE || WISE || — || align=right | 3.4 km || 
|-id=961 bgcolor=#E9E9E9
| 460961 ||  || — || October 16, 2009 || Mount Lemmon || Mount Lemmon Survey || HOF || align=right | 2.3 km || 
|-id=962 bgcolor=#d6d6d6
| 460962 ||  || — || November 23, 2009 || Mount Lemmon || Mount Lemmon Survey || — || align=right | 3.3 km || 
|-id=963 bgcolor=#d6d6d6
| 460963 ||  || — || May 14, 2012 || Kitt Peak || Spacewatch || — || align=right | 3.2 km || 
|-id=964 bgcolor=#E9E9E9
| 460964 ||  || — || April 23, 2004 || Kitt Peak || Spacewatch || EUN || align=right | 1.4 km || 
|-id=965 bgcolor=#d6d6d6
| 460965 ||  || — || February 14, 2005 || Kitt Peak || Spacewatch || EMA || align=right | 2.9 km || 
|-id=966 bgcolor=#d6d6d6
| 460966 ||  || — || June 10, 2007 || Kitt Peak || Spacewatch || NAE || align=right | 2.4 km || 
|-id=967 bgcolor=#d6d6d6
| 460967 ||  || — || January 6, 2010 || Mount Lemmon || Mount Lemmon Survey || — || align=right | 3.4 km || 
|-id=968 bgcolor=#d6d6d6
| 460968 ||  || — || May 3, 2010 || WISE || WISE || — || align=right | 2.8 km || 
|-id=969 bgcolor=#d6d6d6
| 460969 ||  || — || September 9, 2008 || Mount Lemmon || Mount Lemmon Survey || — || align=right | 2.9 km || 
|-id=970 bgcolor=#fefefe
| 460970 ||  || — || May 3, 2003 || Kitt Peak || Spacewatch || — || align=right data-sort-value="0.67" | 670 m || 
|-id=971 bgcolor=#fefefe
| 460971 ||  || — || January 19, 2012 || Kitt Peak || Spacewatch || V || align=right data-sort-value="0.74" | 740 m || 
|-id=972 bgcolor=#E9E9E9
| 460972 ||  || — || April 15, 2008 || Mount Lemmon || Mount Lemmon Survey || — || align=right | 3.0 km || 
|-id=973 bgcolor=#d6d6d6
| 460973 ||  || — || March 25, 2007 || Mount Lemmon || Mount Lemmon Survey || — || align=right | 2.8 km || 
|-id=974 bgcolor=#E9E9E9
| 460974 ||  || — || December 2, 2010 || Kitt Peak || Spacewatch || — || align=right | 1.5 km || 
|-id=975 bgcolor=#d6d6d6
| 460975 ||  || — || May 5, 2010 || WISE || WISE || 7:4 || align=right | 4.5 km || 
|-id=976 bgcolor=#d6d6d6
| 460976 ||  || — || May 31, 2006 || Kitt Peak || Spacewatch || — || align=right | 3.3 km || 
|-id=977 bgcolor=#d6d6d6
| 460977 ||  || — || February 25, 2011 || Kitt Peak || Spacewatch || EOS || align=right | 2.2 km || 
|-id=978 bgcolor=#d6d6d6
| 460978 ||  || — || March 18, 2010 || WISE || WISE || — || align=right | 3.5 km || 
|-id=979 bgcolor=#d6d6d6
| 460979 ||  || — || July 30, 2008 || Mount Lemmon || Mount Lemmon Survey || — || align=right | 3.1 km || 
|-id=980 bgcolor=#d6d6d6
| 460980 ||  || — || September 21, 2008 || Mount Lemmon || Mount Lemmon Survey || EOS || align=right | 1.6 km || 
|-id=981 bgcolor=#d6d6d6
| 460981 ||  || — || May 9, 2006 || Mount Lemmon || Mount Lemmon Survey || — || align=right | 3.7 km || 
|-id=982 bgcolor=#d6d6d6
| 460982 ||  || — || December 10, 2009 || Mount Lemmon || Mount Lemmon Survey || — || align=right | 3.2 km || 
|-id=983 bgcolor=#d6d6d6
| 460983 ||  || — || November 23, 2009 || Kitt Peak || Spacewatch || — || align=right | 4.1 km || 
|-id=984 bgcolor=#d6d6d6
| 460984 ||  || — || April 13, 2012 || Kitt Peak || Spacewatch || — || align=right | 3.9 km || 
|-id=985 bgcolor=#d6d6d6
| 460985 ||  || — || March 5, 2011 || Mount Lemmon || Mount Lemmon Survey || EOS || align=right | 1.9 km || 
|-id=986 bgcolor=#d6d6d6
| 460986 ||  || — || March 29, 2010 || WISE || WISE || — || align=right | 3.1 km || 
|-id=987 bgcolor=#d6d6d6
| 460987 ||  || — || December 17, 2009 || Mount Lemmon || Mount Lemmon Survey || — || align=right | 3.2 km || 
|-id=988 bgcolor=#d6d6d6
| 460988 ||  || — || March 9, 2011 || Mount Lemmon || Mount Lemmon Survey || EOS || align=right | 2.0 km || 
|-id=989 bgcolor=#E9E9E9
| 460989 ||  || — || September 13, 2005 || Kitt Peak || Spacewatch || — || align=right | 1.7 km || 
|-id=990 bgcolor=#d6d6d6
| 460990 ||  || — || January 21, 2009 || Mount Lemmon || Mount Lemmon Survey || 7:4 || align=right | 5.5 km || 
|-id=991 bgcolor=#d6d6d6
| 460991 ||  || — || March 3, 2006 || Mount Lemmon || Mount Lemmon Survey || EOS || align=right | 2.0 km || 
|-id=992 bgcolor=#d6d6d6
| 460992 ||  || — || January 8, 2010 || Mount Lemmon || Mount Lemmon Survey || — || align=right | 3.6 km || 
|-id=993 bgcolor=#d6d6d6
| 460993 ||  || — || December 14, 2004 || Kitt Peak || Spacewatch || — || align=right | 3.9 km || 
|-id=994 bgcolor=#d6d6d6
| 460994 ||  || — || January 13, 2005 || Kitt Peak || Spacewatch || EOS || align=right | 1.9 km || 
|-id=995 bgcolor=#E9E9E9
| 460995 ||  || — || September 18, 2009 || Kitt Peak || Spacewatch || MRX || align=right | 1.3 km || 
|-id=996 bgcolor=#E9E9E9
| 460996 ||  || — || September 23, 2009 || Mount Lemmon || Mount Lemmon Survey || — || align=right | 2.3 km || 
|-id=997 bgcolor=#E9E9E9
| 460997 ||  || — || March 13, 2007 || Kitt Peak || Spacewatch || — || align=right | 2.1 km || 
|-id=998 bgcolor=#d6d6d6
| 460998 ||  || — || March 11, 2005 || Catalina || CSS || — || align=right | 3.9 km || 
|-id=999 bgcolor=#d6d6d6
| 460999 ||  || — || December 20, 2009 || Mount Lemmon || Mount Lemmon Survey || — || align=right | 3.7 km || 
|-id=000 bgcolor=#d6d6d6
| 461000 ||  || — || September 5, 2008 || Kitt Peak || Spacewatch || — || align=right | 2.9 km || 
|}

References

External links 
 Discovery Circumstances: Numbered Minor Planets (460001)–(465000) (IAU Minor Planet Center)

0460